= Rose Montoya =

American transgender activist and model

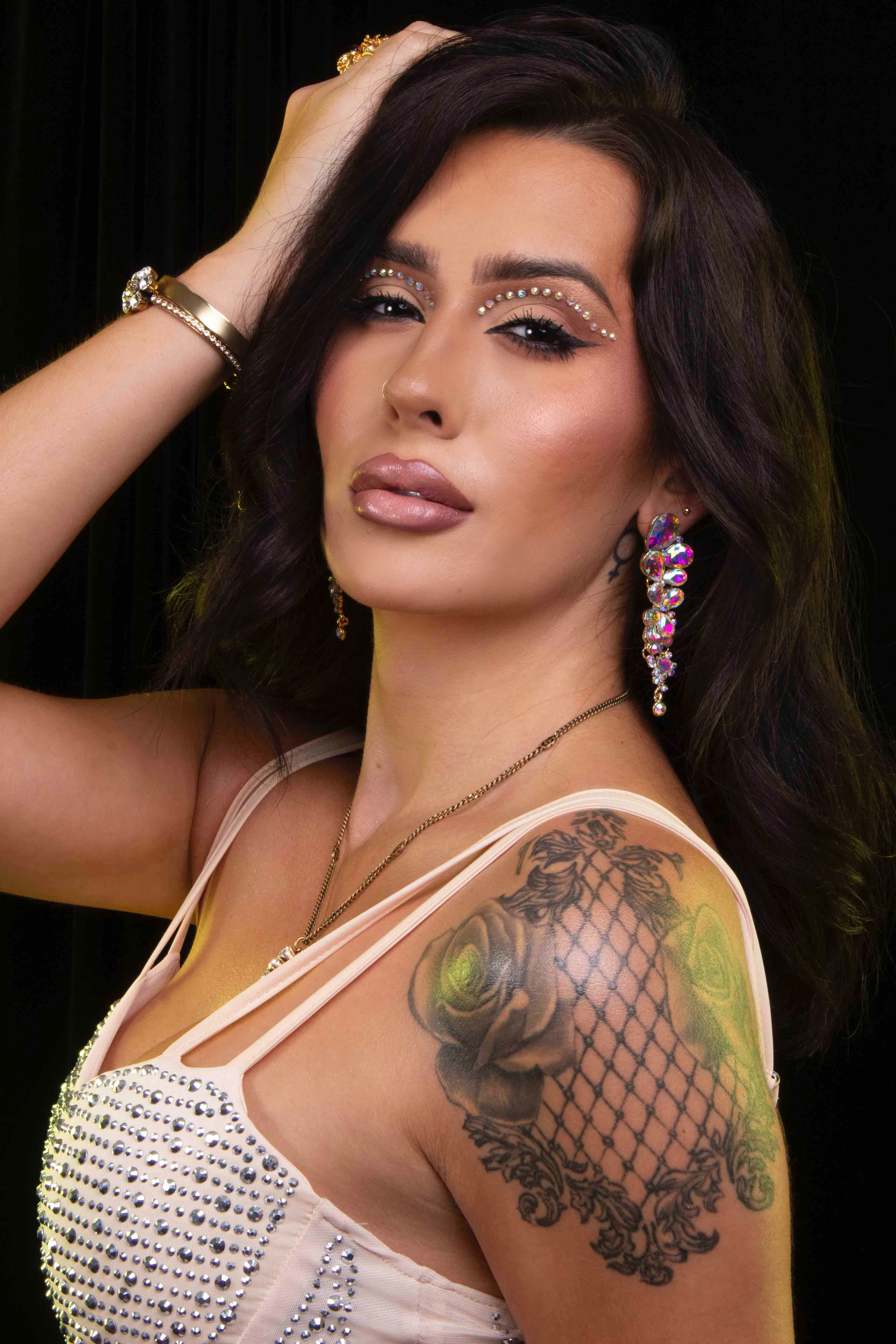
- Montoya in 2022
- Born: October 10, 1995 (age 31); Idaho, U.S.
- Education: Seattle University
- Occupations: Model; content creator; activist
- Years active: 2018 – present

TikTok information
- Page: rosemontoya
- Followers: 790.9K
- Last updated: March 12, 2024
- Website: rosemontoya.com

Rosalynne "Rose" Montoya (born October 10, 1995), is an American transgender activist, public speaker, and content creator known for her advocacy on LGBTQ+ rights, gender inclusion, and trans visibility. She (Note: Rose is a nonbinary trans woman and uses both they and she pronouns. This article uses she/her for consistency.) gained prominence through educational videos and personal storytelling on platforms like TikTok and Instagram, where she shares insights about trans identity, body autonomy, and intersectional equity. Montoya has also modeled in campaigns that challenge conventional beauty standards, including Chromat's final collection, Collective Opulence Celebrating Kindred—a collaboration with artist and filmmaker Tourmaline featured in Vogue—where she posed untucked as a statement on body autonomy and gender expression, further cementing her role at the intersection of fashion and social change.

== Early life and education ==
Montoya was born on October 10, 1995. She grew up in rural southern Idaho in a family with four siblings. She learned American Sign Language as a child due to her mother working as a sign language interpreter. Montoya's family later adopted her youngest sister from China, who is Deaf. Her father worked as a worship pastor at their church and her mother worked as a Christian missionary. Montoya realized she was attracted to men in Middle School and was outed in 2010 while in high school. She then began performing in drag shows in college, which led to her coming out as a transgender woman in 2015. She started transitioning on June 23, 2015, and changed her legal name in September 2015. In 2016, she came out as bisexual and, in 2019, as a non-binary transgender woman using both feminine and non-binary gender pronouns.

Montoya graduated in 2015 from Seattle University with a Bachelor of Arts degree in film studies at 19 years old.

== Career ==
=== Makeup ===
Montoya worked as a full-time makeup artist and manager at a department store's cosmetics counter until she was laid off during the COVID-19 pandemic in the United States. During this time, she focused on turning her social media platforms into a full-time job.

=== Social media ===
Montoya uses her social media to create educational content regarding transgender issues, experiences, and rights. She has made sponsored posts with FX Networks, New York City Pride, Planned Parenthood, Fenty Beauty, Parade, and Fluide. In 2022, Montoya was nominated for Favorite TikToker at the 10th annual Queerty Awards. In 2024, she was nominated by the Los Angeles Blade's Reader Choice Awards for Best Local Influencer. In 2025, she won Best Local Influencer and Local Activist.

=== Viral TSA video ===
In March 2021, Montoya had a difficult experience with the Transportation Security Administration at an airport in Phoenix, Arizona. A TikTok video about it received over twenty million views. Montoya said her documentation recognizes her as female, but airport scanners, which categorize travelers as male or female due to genitalia, set off alarms. After disclosing to the TSA attendant that she is transgender, the agent asked if Montoya would prefer to be "scanned as a man instead." Montoya stated that then, after triggering the alarm again, the TSA tried to assign a male agent to pat her down despite her being a trans woman. This viral moment led to a phone call where Montoya consulted for the US Department of Homeland Security (DHS).

=== Motivational speaking and advocacy ===
Montoya has spoken and presented on transgender rights at the Philadelphia Trans Wellness Conference, the Downtown Emergency Service Center, the University of Pittsburgh, Stanford University, and Yale University.

She launched the educational website The Trans 101 to spread awareness regarding issues faced by transgender people.

Montoya is also a board member of the non-profit, Aadya Rising.

She was one of the activists featured in Out's 18 LGBTQ+ Policy Makers and Advocates Changing the World.

In June 2023, Rose spoke at the National Press Club to advocate for policy change in support of transgender rights. In November 2023, she published an op-ed in Time magazine about the over-sexualization of trans bodies and the desire-to-cruelty-pipeline.

In May 2024, Rose spoke on a panel at the Hollywood and Mind Summit, where she advocated for hiring trans people and the importance of taking care of mental health while being a public figure.

In 2025, Rose was also invited by Representatives Alexandria Ocasio-Cortez and Bernie Sanders to attend the Fight Oligarchy rally in Los Angeles, where she created a collaborative video with both lawmakers and interviewed Representative Pramila Jayapal about federal protections for transgender people.

In February 2025, Rose spoke at a rally in front of Children's Hospital LA after they made the decision to stop providing gender-affirming care to patients 19 years old and younger.

In June 2025, Rose the Best Local Activist Award from the Los Angeles Blade Readers' Choice Awards.

Rose gave a keynote speech at the Human Rights Campaign's rally for the National Trans Visibility March, held during World Pride in D.C. 2025. That June, she also interviewed Representatives Becca Balint and Ro Khanna on issues related to Medicaid access, the humanitarian crisis in Gaza, and the intersection of trans rights with broader policy concerns.

Following the ICE raids in Los Angeles in June 2025, Rose publicly protested the actions and released multiple videos expressing support for immigrant communities.

=== Modeling ===
Montoya began modeling in 2018, after she was discovered by the undergarment company TomboyX. She has modeled in advertisement campaigns for Savage X Fenty, Yandy.com, Adore Me, Toms Shoes, and oVertone. In June 2021, Rose was featured on a billboard in New York City as one of the faces of LGBTQ telehealth group Folx Health's launch campaign for PreP. In 2023, Rose was on the Cover of Go Magazine's Pride Issue "100 Women We Love." In 2025, Montoya modeled in Chromat's final collection, Collective Opulence Celebrating Kindred—a collaboration with artist and filmmaker Tourmaline featured in Vogue—where she posed untucked as a statement on body autonomy and gender expression, further cementing her role at the intersection of fashion and social change.

== Personal life ==
Montoya has spoken publicly about gender-affirming surgeries she underwent, including a breast augmentation, a tracheal shave, a genioplasty, a Brazilian butt lift, and facial feminization surgery. She has also opened up about her experiences living with chronic anxiety and depression.

Montoya is polyamorous and frequently uses her platforms to educate people about different relationship structures. Montoya used to be Bob the Drag Queen's metamour and joined him for a podcast episode. During this time, she also dated Ezra Michel.

=== White House Pride controversy ===
In June 2023, Montoya attended a Pride month celebration at the White House in Washington DC where she was among the hundreds greeted by US President Joe Biden. She elicited controversy due to a TikTok video she shared with her nearly 800K followers. The video included 3 seconds in which she and two other attendees removed their clothing above the waist. Rose covered her nipples the entire time. After a full day, the TikTok video was then shared by Libs of TikTok which caused the video to go viral on far-right Twitter and was then picked up by conservative media. Fox News wrote three articles about the incident in one day. The White House called the act "disrespectful" and said that the individuals in the video "would not be invited back to future events". Rose has since issued an apology video. While in DC, Rose also spoke at the National Press Club to advocate for policy change in support of transgender rights.

== Filmography ==
=== Television ===
Year	Title	Role	Notes	Ref.
2024	International Vogue League	Herself (Contestant)	Walked Face	
2024	Based on a True Story	Woman	Season 2, Episode 2	
2024	Royal T	Herself	Ballroom Seen Episode	
2023	International Vogue League	Herself (Contestant)	Walked Realness	
2023	Drag Race Latina	Herself (Special Guest)	Season 2, Episode 6	
2023	Jennifer Hudson Show	Herself (Audience Member)	Season 1, Episode 92	
2023	The Q Agenda	Herself (Guest)	Season 8, Episode 11	

=== Film ===
Year	Title	Role	Notes	Ref.
2023	Agents of Change: Project Polymer	Waitress	Short	

== Awards, nominations, and honors ==
Year	Award	Category	Work	Result	Notes	Ref.
2026	Spain Talks	Ambassador Award	Herself	Won	Honors the top advocate or content creator who has helped position Spain as a sustainable and inclusive destination.	
2026	Los Angeles Blade Reader's Choice	Favorite Influencer	Herself	Won	Voting is open through March 6, 2026	
2026	Los Angeles Blade Reader's Choice	Local Activist of the Year	Herself	Nominated	Voting is open through March 6, 2026	
2025	Los Angeles Blade Reader's Choice	Local Activist of the Year	Herself	Won		
2025	Los Angeles Blade Reader's Choice	Favorite Influencer	Herself	Won		
2024	Los Angeles Blade Reader's Choice	Favorite Influencer	Herself	Nominated		
2023	GLAAD Media Award	Special Recognition	Herself	N/A	Revry TV's Drag Latina was Recognized	
2022	Queerty Awards	Favorite TikToker	Herself	Nominated		

- 2021 - Out Magazine's Out 100 Honoree honoring the magazine's selection of 18 LGBTQ+ Policy Makers and Advocates Changing the World in 2021
- 2021 - One of 18 Latinx Creatives to Follow from Arizona Republic
