= Maya Morsy =

Egyptian political scientist

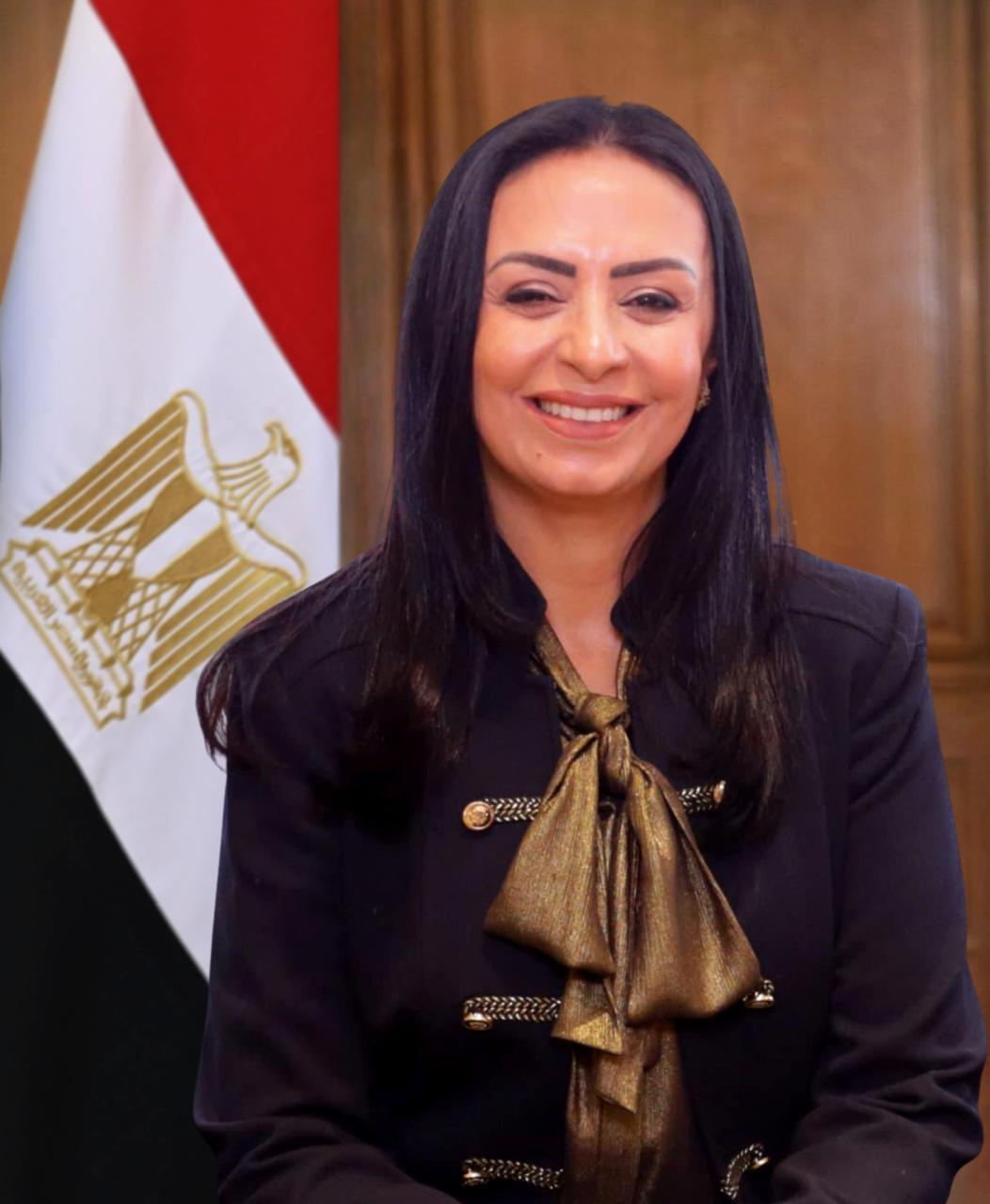

Minister of Social Solidarity
- Incumbent
- Assumed office 3 July 2024
- President: Abdel Fattah el-Sisi
- Prime Minister: Mostafa Madbouly
- Preceded by: Nevine el-Kabbaj

President of the National Council for Women
- In office 1 February 2016 – 3 July 2024
- Preceded by: Mervat Tallawy
- Succeeded by: Amal Ammar

Head of the Egypt Country Office United Nations Fund for Women
- In office 2011–2013

Country Coordinator/Director of UNIFEM and liaison for the League of Arab States
- In office 1999–2010

Personal details
- Born: Maya Mohamed Abdel-Moneim Morsy; 13 December 1973 (age 52)
- Education: Institute of Arab Research and Studies (PhD); City University of Seattle (MA); City University of Seattle (MBA); The American University in Cairo (BA)

Maya Morsy (Arabic: مايا مرسي; born 13 December 1973) is an Egyptian political scientist, specialist in public policy, and advocate for women's and human rights. She is the Minister of Social Solidarity of Egypt since 2024 and served as president of the National Council for Women between 2016 and 2024.

Morsy previously served as regional gender team leader for the Regional bureau of United Nations Development Programme in New York City and Regional Center in Amman before she served as the Country Manager for the United Nations Development Fund for Women. She has been described as "one of the best public policy experts on social gender in Egypt, and perhaps even in all of the Arab world".

In 2022, Morsy was elected by the UN member states to the United nations Committee on the Elimination of Discrimination against Women (CEDAW) from 2023 to 2026.

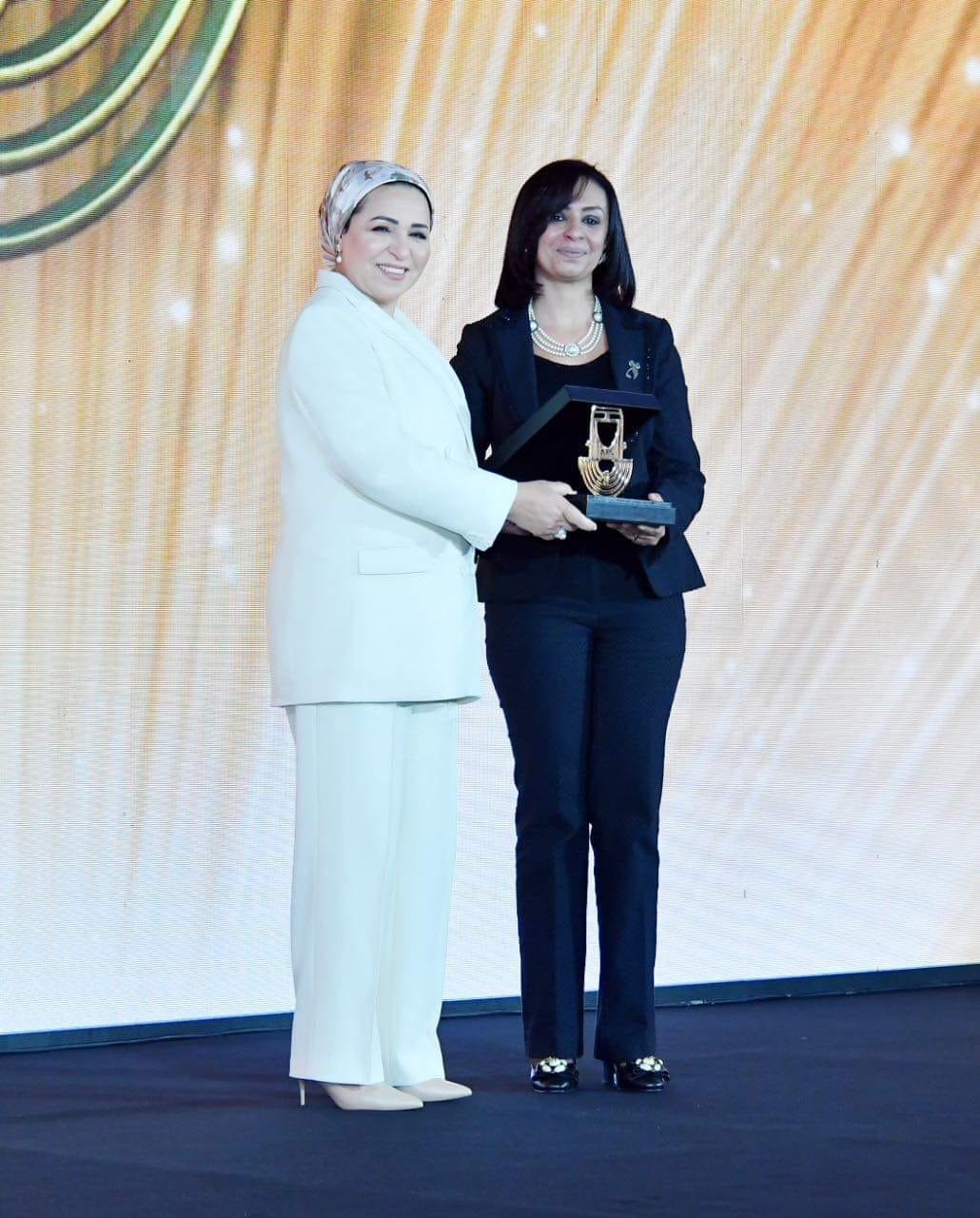
Maya Morsy receives honors from the First Lady of Egypt

== Education ==
Morsy completed a BA (political science, 1995) at the American University in Cairo; and an MBA (1997) and an MA (public administration, (1998)) at City University of Seattle. She completed a PhD (public policy, 2008) at the Institute of Arab Research and Studies in Cairo, and was a 2019 nominee for the Honorary Degree of Doctor of Philosophy from Honoris causa Rai University, Ahmedabad in Gujarat, India with a Focus on Girls education and Women’s empowerment.

== Career ==
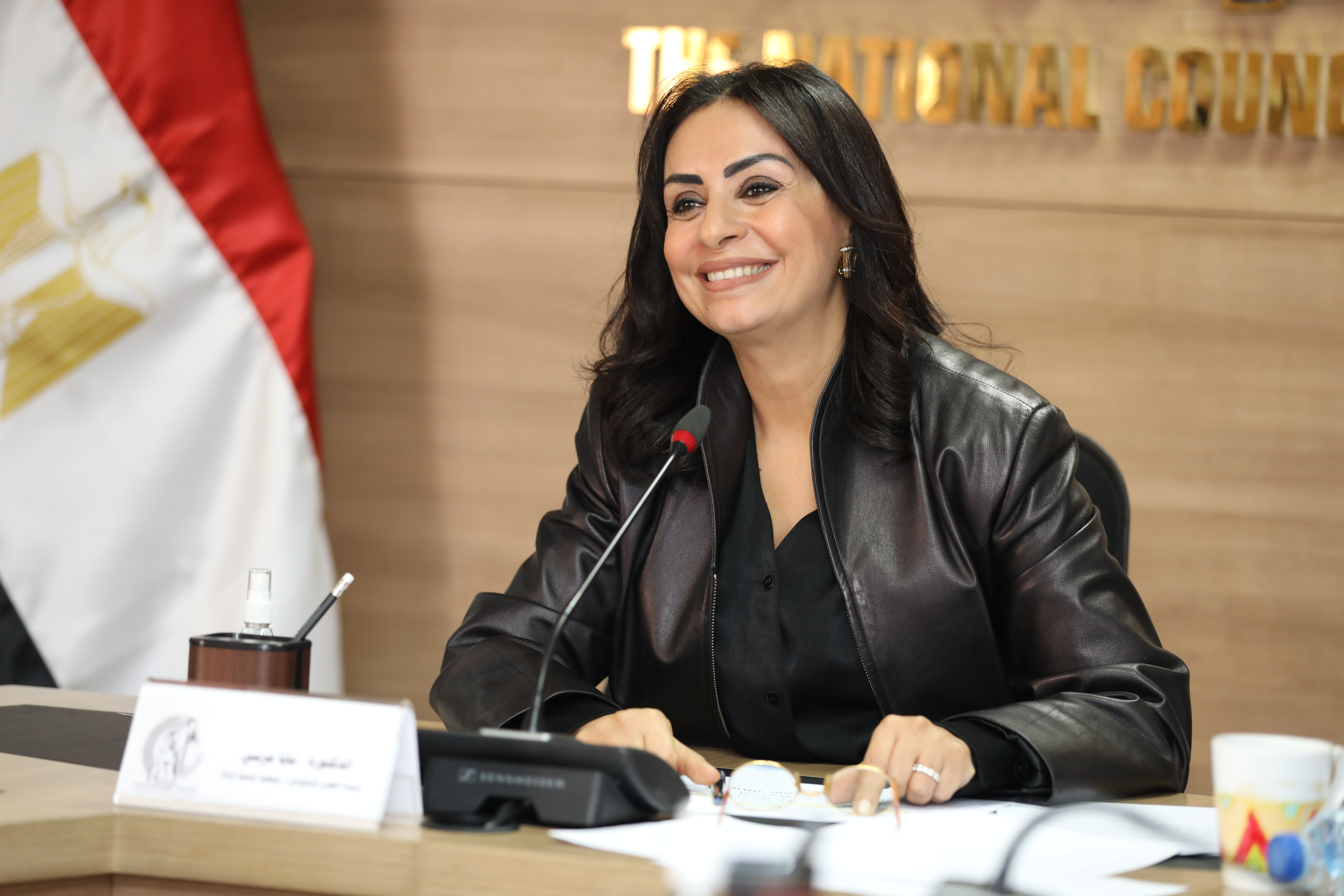
Maya Morsy at National Council for Women

In her capacity as President of NCW in Egypt, Morsy is also head of the supreme council of the Arab Women Organization, Current President of the Ministerial Council of Women Development Organization, and Chair of the Executive Bureau of the Women Development Organization of the Member states of the Organisation of Islamic Cooperation. Morsy also is the Co-Chair of the National Committee to Eradicate Female Genital Mutilation since 2019.

Morsy is also G100 Global Chair on Economic empowerment within Group of 100 Global Women leaders

In 2021, She Headed the Egyptian Delegation entitled to discuss Egypt’s 8th – 10th periodic reports to the UN CEDAW in Geneva.

In 2019, Morsy was member of the Egyptian Delegation discussing Egypt's universal periodic report by the UN human rights council.

During her time, The National Council for Women together with the World bank Group in Egypt launched the Women's Economic Empowerment Report in 2019.

Morsy Led the development of the Egypt’s National Women’s Strategy 2030 launched and endorsed by the President of Egypt in March 2017.

During COVID19 pandemic, Morsy also published Egypt's rapid response to women's situation during COVID19 Outbreak, which is the first policy note globally to be issued on considering women's needs during the pandemic. She also managed to issue 4 editions of the first ever Women Policy Tracker to track & monitor gender sensitive Government responses in Egypt.

During her time, Egypt took first place among countries within North Africa & Western Asia region to consider women needs during COVID19, according to a global report issued by UNDP and UNWOMEN.

Together with Minister of International cooperation Rania El-Mashat, and the World Economic Forum Morsy Co led launching "Closing the Gender Gap Accelerator”, which is the first of its kind public-private collaboration model in Africa and the Middle East and North Africa

Morsy also led reviving the world bank's model on Egyptian Gender equality seal certification program for private sector companies

And concerning the Economic Empowerment of Women, Morsy introduced Financial inclusion mega program in Egypt "National Digital Village Savings and Loans Associations (VSLAs)” programme"

Morsy also introduced an assets investment framework for adolescent girls "Noura" & girls empowerment program "Dawwie" which are implemented under the auspices of The First Lady of Egypt and the framework was also launched within the UN CSW67th session in New York. In September 2021 Morsy also led the establishment of UNDP Egypt's Human Development Report 2021: Egypt Pathways and Prospects in her capacity as the rapporteur of its 2021 version.

Also in 2021, Morsy led publishing a report on the National Strategy to Eliminate violence against Women 2015-2020

As lead up to UNFCCC COP27 that was hosted in Egypt's Sharm el-Sheikh in 2022, Morsy Launched Egypt's Global Perspective: Women, Environment, & Climate Change in New York during the UN Commission on the Status of Women CSW66th session.

=== Earlier in her career ===
In 2014–2015, Morsy served as the United Nations Development Programme's regional gender team leader for the Arab Region.; and before that she was UNIFEM's country program manager (2000–2013).

Morsy was earlier a project coordinator for the United Nations Development Fund for Women (UNIFEM) (1999–2000); She was a consultant for the Girls Education and Empowerment Project of the Egyptian Ministry of Education (1998–1999); and as an academic facilitator for the City University of Seattle and the Arab Academy of Science and Technology (1997–1998).

She also worked as a project officer in Egypt in the Sustainable Human Development Platform for Action and Monitoring (1995–1998),

== Honors and awards ==
- The First Egyptian Woman to Receive the Award of “Women of the Decade in Public Life and Empowerment”, from the Women Economic Forum India, 2018.
- “50 Most Influential Women Award” Top 50 Most influential women, 2016.
- The Aswan International Women's Film Festival gave the "Noon Award" to Morsy in the field of women’s issues, in appreciation of her efforts to support and empower Egyptian women since assuming her position.
- “Arab Women Special Award” in the health Sector, by the Arab Ministers of Health in the 47th Ministerial Meeting in the League of Arab States, 2017.
- The first to receive the “Top Achievers Awards" for institutional achievement on women empowerment from Amwal Alghad in 2024.

== Memberships ==
- Appointed by the President of Egypt to the board of the National Coalition for Civil Development Work, 2024
- Member of the Board of trustees in Egypt's National dialogue between political forces,2022

- Member of the Board of Directors of Cairo International center for conflict resolution, peace keeping and pace building CCCPA
- Member of the Board of advisory of Kemet Boutros Ghaly foundation for peace and knowledge
- Member in the Egyptian National African Peer Review Mechanism APRM Committee
- Former Board Member in IT Industry Development Agency Itida
- Former Member of the Board of Directors of Banque Misr

== Publications ==
- 10 years commemorative edition Egypts Political will to women's empowerment, 2024
- 10 years of achievement of NCW, 2023
- Egypt's Global perspective on Women, Environment and Climate Change, 2022
- UNDP Egypt's Human Development Report: Egypt Pathways and Prospects, 2021
- REPORT ON THE NATIONAL STRATEGY TO ELIMINATE VIOLENCE AGAINST WOMEN 2-15-2020, 2021
- Egypt's Rapid Response on Women's Situation During Covid 19, 2020
- 5 Editions of Women and COVID policy tracker, 2020
- Women's economic empowerment report, 2019
- National Strategy for Women 2030، 2017
