= University of Seattle =

University of Seattle may refer to:

- University of Washington Seattle, a public research university
- Seattle University, a private Jesuit university
- City University of Seattle, a private university
