= Iskra Lawrence =

British model (born 1990)

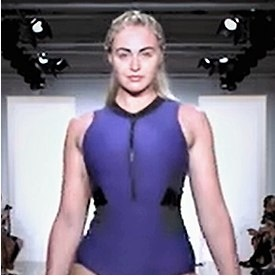
- Born: Iskra Arabella Lawrence; 11 September 1990 (age 36); Wolverhampton, England
- Occupation: Model
- Years active: 2008–present
- Partner: Philip Payne
- Children: 2
- Modelling information
- Height: 1.75 m (5 ft 9 in)
- Hair colour: Blonde
- Eye colour: Blue
- Agency: JAG Models (New York); Models 1 (London)
- Website: iskralawrence.com

Iskra Arabella Lawrence (born 11 September 1990) is a British model.

== Early life and education ==
Lawrence was born on 11 September 1990 in Wolverhampton and grew up in Kidderminster, Worcestershire from the age of 6 weeks. Her name means 'spark' in most Slavic languages.

Lawrence attended Holy Trinity School, Kidderminster, Malvern St James and then Bromsgrove School, was a competitive national swimmer, and was accepted into the UK National Youth Theatre at 15.

== Career ==
=== Modelling ===
Lawrence was the Global Role Model & a model for the lingerie line brand Aerie, a brand of intimate apparel from American Eagle Outfitters from 2014-2021 when she announced her departure via an Instagram on her feed.

She has also modeled for the lingerie line brand Adore Me.

After 13 years of modeling Lawrence completed her catwalk debut at New York Fashion Week for Chromat in 2016, and walked in L'Oréal's first fashion show at Paris Fashion week in October 2017.

American Eagle Outfitters chose Lawrence along with five other millennials for their Fall 2017 jean campaign "The New American Jean", which makes use of unretouched images.

In 2018, Lawrence was announced as a brand ambassador for Marina Rinaldi's Persona collection campaign.

=== Activism and charitable work ===
Lawrence is a National Eating Disorders Association (NEDA) brand ambassador and creator of the NEDA Inspires Award.

Lawrence does not retouch her own images that she posts on social media platforms such as Instagram and Facebook. She actively criticizes "body shamers", including one user that she confronted in April 2016 on her Instagram account after the user insulted her. She does not want to be classified as a plus-sized model.

In 2017, Lawrence appeared in the Straight Curve documentary "about body image and the industry leaders challenging society's unrealistic and dangerous standards of beauty".

In February 2017, Lawrence presented "Ending the pursuit of perfection" at TEDxUniversityofNevada.

In 2018, Lawrence was announced as a L'Oréal Princes Trust Ambassador.

== Accolades ==
In 2016, Lawrence was chosen as one of BBC's World's 100 Women, and in 2017 she was one of the seven women chosen for World Association of Girl Guides and Girl Scouts Great Girl Leaders.

Lawrence was listed in the 'multi-hyphenates' category of the 2017 Maxim HOT 100.

In 2019, Lawrence was named in the Forbes 30 Under 30 for Europe within the Art & Culture category. In their centennial year Malvern St James school recognised Lawrence as one of their Malvern Alumnae 100 "Celebrating the talent and diversity of Malvern Old Girls. Inspiring the women of the future."

== Other work ==
Lawrence was a contributor to Self magazine, and was the founding managing editor at Runway Riot, a website meant to be an outlet for women of all shapes and sizes to learn about glamour.

In 2018 Lawrence was the host of "The Mirror Challenge with Iskra" a Facebook Watch series from Clevver Media a brand of Defy Media. As the creator of the show's main concept, Lawrence also received a producer credit for the program.

In 2011, Lawrence also starred as an extra in the British TV Show Misfits, portraying a zombie cheerleader.

== Personal life ==
In January 2019, Lawrence confirmed her relationship with songwriter Philip Payne.

In November 2019, Lawrence announced that she was expecting her and Payne's first child together. On April 16, 2020, she gave birth to her son.

In April 2024, she announced that she was expecting her and Payne's second child together. On October 6, 2024, she gave birth to her daughter.
