= Rector Hotel =

Historic hotel in Seattle, US

- U.S. National Register of Historic Places
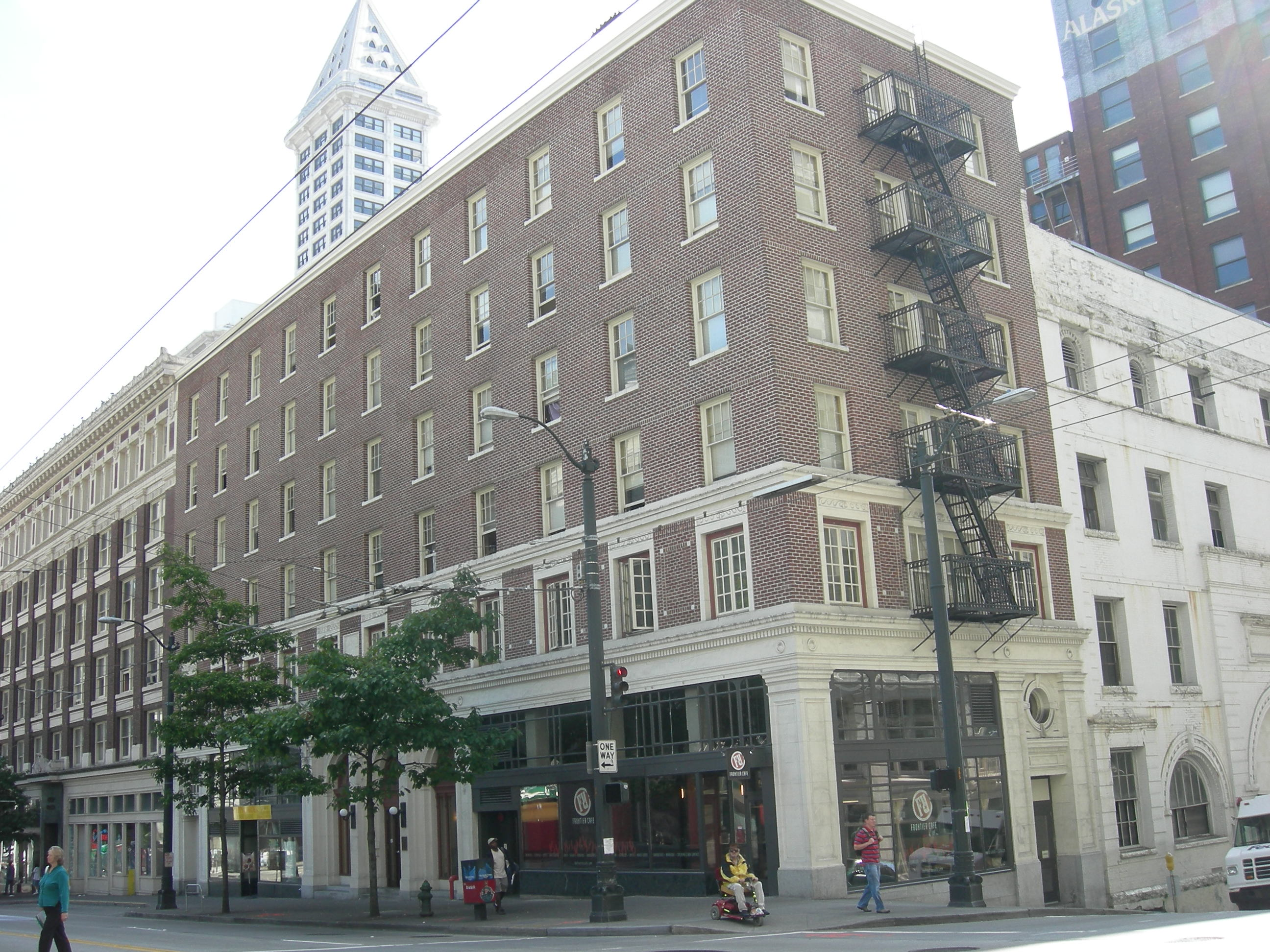
- Rector Hotel in 2007, with Lyon Building to the left

- Location within Downtown Seattle
- Location: 619-621 Third Ave., Seattle, Washington
- Coordinates: 47°36′12″N 122°19′51″W
- Area: less than one acre
- Built: 1911-12
- Built by: Harry Brandt (Contractor)
- Architect: John Graham, Sr.
- Architectural style: Beaux Arts
- NRHP reference No.: 02000863
- Added to NRHP: August 9, 2002

The Rector Hotel, later known as the St. Charles Hotel and during the 1930s the Governor Hotel, is a historic hotel building located at the Southwest corner of Third Avenue and Cherry Street in downtown Seattle, Washington. It was constructed in the latter half of 1911 by the estate of pioneer lumber baron Amos Brown. Designed by prominent Seattle architect John Graham, Sr., the original plans were for a twelve-story building that would be built in two phases but the top 6 floors were never added. Originally a hotel serving the tourist trade, by the 1970s it was operating as a Single resident occupancy hotel. In 1986 it was renovated into low-income housing by the Plymouth Housing Group. In 2002 it was added to the National Register of Historic Places.

It is located north of historic Pioneer Square, "in the shadow of" the Smith Tower, and adjacent to the former Grand Opera House and the 1910-built Chicago School-style Lyon Building, also designed by John Graham.

== History ==
=== Amos Brown ===
Amos Brown, a native of New Hampshire, was lured to the Northwest in the 1850s, like many, by the promise of riches during the Fraser Canyon Gold Rush but by the time he arrived in Victoria, British Columbia, the rush was all but over. Undaunted, he decided to throw his lot in with the growing local lumber industry, landing at Port Gamble, Washington in 1859 where he went to work running logging camps for Cyrus Walker. He soon came into his own, opening logging camps and mills throughout Puget Sound and by the 1870s had become one of the most powerful lumber men in the region. The same year he had arrived in Port Gamble, he purchased the first of many pieces of Seattle real estate sight unseen, that by the time of his death would be some of the most valuable property in the city. After his marriage to Annie Peoples, one of the famous Mercer Girls, in 1867, Brown would make Seattle his permanent home, joining the city council and building a stately residence on his property at First Avenue and Spring Streets in the early 1870s. Brown retired from logging in 1882 to focus on improving his real estate holdings. He died from complications from stomach cancer in 1899 with an estate valued at nearly $400,000.

=== The Rector Hotel ===
Of Brown's real estate holdings, the 2 lots at the southwest corner of Cherry Street and Third Avenue were identified as the most valuable. Brown had purchased the two lots from Henry Yesler in 1890 in partnership with Jacob Furth and J.D. Lowman, of Lowman and Hanford but would later buy out their interests. 1 year prior to Brown's death, the Western 2/3rds of the property facing Cherry Street had been leased to theater operator John Cort who opened a beer hall and one year after Brown's death built the Grand Opera House on the site. The remaining 35' X 120' sliver of property facing Third Avenue, made narrower after the widening of that street in the 1900s, was filled with a row of pre-fire wooden tenement houses anchored by the Rainier Lodging House, which had originally been the home of pioneer Ursula Wyckoff dating back to 1883. Originally built at the site of the present Alaska Building, Amos Brown purchased the building and had it moved onto his lot in the 1890s. By 1910 it was the only corner of this intersection that hadn't been improved with larger more permanent structures.

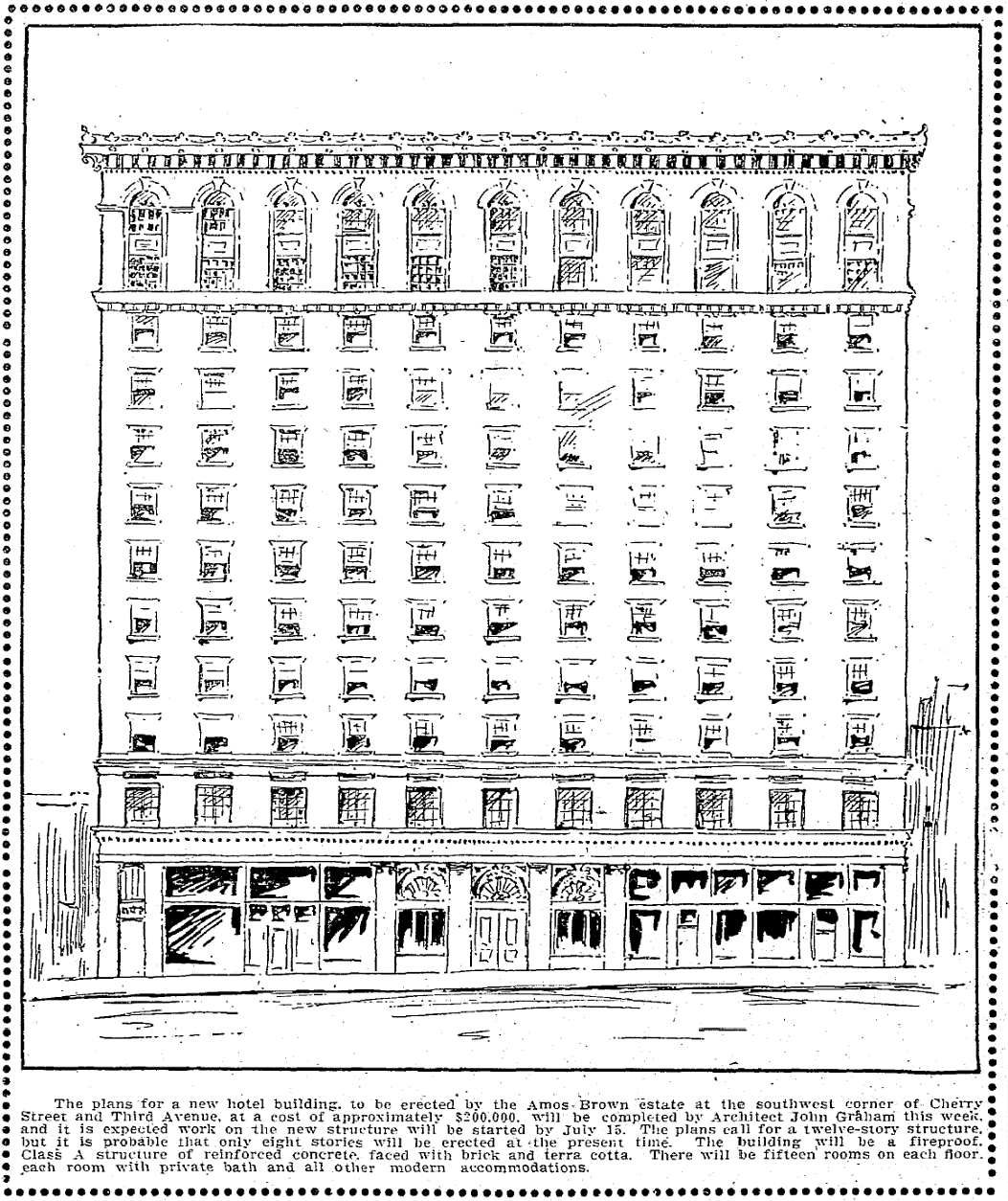
Conceptual elevation of the building as it was meant to be completed, July 1911.

In 1911, Brown's estate under the direction of his son Alson L. Brown commissioned architect John Graham, Sr. (whose offices were located in the recently completed Lyon Building next door) to design a fireproof hotel building for their lot. They had Graham make plans for both an 8-floor and 12-floor design that they would decide upon if the bids for the larger design met their budget or not. Graham's design was for a 3-part Beaux-Arts tower faced with limestone, brick and terra cotta over a reinforced concrete structure. They ultimately opted for the 12-floor design, costing an estimated $200,000, but chose to only complete the first 6 floors for the time being. Graham's concept sketch was published in the July 9, 1911 edition of the Seattle Times, showing the building as it would have been with the top 2 floors forming the capital of the 3-part design with arched windows and a large dentiled cornice. Demolition of the old buildings by contractor Sherman G. Combs began in July 1911 and excavation of the lot was completed by the end of August. Harry Brandt was awarded the general contract and the building's steel and concrete structure was finished by the end of the year. Although the building was completed by early 1912, the hotel itself wouldn't open for another year; the reason for this delay was never made clear. The Hotel Rector, operated by the Levinson Hotel Company, Inc., officially opened on May 5, 1913, touting its fireproof building and the fact that it was completely furnished by Seattle labor. Doc Humphrey, previously of the Frye Hotel, was its first manager. A large neon sign spanning the building's top 5 floors could be seen up and down Cherry Street.

=== The St. Charles Hotel ===
Expansion of the hotel remained in limbo after A.L. Brown was removed as receiver from his father's estate by the rest of his family after he was found to have embezzled over $300,000 in funds for his own personal use and to pay off debts for various farming scams. The financial repercussions continued to multiply as more parties came forward against the estate and Brown was forced to declare bankruptcy. The Rector Hotel and adjoining Grand Opera House building were foreclosed upon and by 1920 all of Brown's real estate holdings had been sold off to settle their delinquent loans. During this legal turmoil the Rector Hotel underwent a massive 6 month interior remodeling in which all the furniture was sold and many of the interior room partitions were rebuilt. The intention was to connect the hotel to the adjacent Opera House building, which had recently been gutted by fire, and add more rooms, but this was never done. The St. Charles Hotel Company was incorporated in August 1917 by the hotel's new managers John and Josephine Farnham and C.A. Spirk and by the end of 1917 the Rector had reopened as the St. Charles Hotel, though still under the operation of the Levinson Company, now known as the Rector Hotel Company. Not long after the Rector name was retired, Levinson would open a New Rector Hotel at 1924 First Avenue.

In April 1920 the St. Charles and Grand Opera House were sold to C.D. Clinton for $250,000. The hotel served a mix of tourists and long-term guests of various reputation. In November 1920 at the height of prohibition a guest was busted on the fifth floor with nine quarts of liquor. By the mid 1920s the building was managed for its owner by Henry Broderick who in 1926, planned to finally add the building's missing floors, though only 5 instead of the original 6, that would double the hotel's capacity but this too never came to pass. The lease and furnishings of the St. Charles were sold to J.A. Ragan of Olympia in May 1927 for $30,000 and the hotel underwent a second interior remodeling in September 1931 after which it was known as the Governor Hotel for about ten years before reverting to the St. Charles and would continue to serve guests for decades.

In March 1985 the St. Charles was purchased for $520,000 by Plymouth Housing Group, a Seattle-based non-profit organization, with plans to convert the hotel into low-income rental housing to serve the increasing amounts of homeless in Seattle. Over the next two years over 1600 hours of volunteer labor went into restoring the building inside and out. With a $637,000 loan from the city, workers installed a new elevator, a second exit, cooking units and laundry, bath and shower facilities. A grand re-opening, attended by mayor Charles Royer was held on September 27, 1987.

== See also ==
- National Register of Historic Places listings in Seattle
