= Simon Cleveland =

- Occupation: Scholar-Practitioner
- Writing career
- Language: English

Simon Cleveland is an American scholar-practitioner, associate professor of the practice, and faculty director at Georgetown University. He is the former executive director and associate dean for The Technology Institute at the City University of Seattle. Cleveland is a graduate of George Mason University and The George Washington University. While a doctoral student, Cleveland was the three-time recipient of the Dr. Harold Kerzner Scholarship. In 2014, he earned his Ph.D. in Information Systems from Nova Southeastern University. His dissertation was titled "A Causal Model to Predict Organizational Knowledge Sharing via Information and Communication Technologies". He also holds certificates in education, analytics, and big data from Harvard University and Massachusetts Institute of Technology. In 2017, Cleveland earned the Tropaia Award: Outstanding Faculty for his work with the Master of Professional Studies in Project Management at Georgetown University.

Cleveland sits on four editorial review boards and is an associate editor for the International Journal of Smart Education and Urban Society. He is a guest lecturer at Brandeis University, Johns Hopkins University, and Northeastern University.

== Editorial Review Boards ==
- International Journal of Information Technology Project Management
- International Journal of Knowledge Management
- International Journal of Cyber Research and Education
- International Journal of Hyperconnectivity and the Internet of Things

== Articles ==
- "Building Engaged Communities -- A Collaborative Leadership Approach", Smart Cities, November 2018
- "Toward a Model for Ethical Cybersecurity Leadership", International Journal of Smart Education and Urban Society, October 2018
- "Toward Cybersecurity Leadership Framework", 13th Midwest Association for Information Systems Conference, May 2018
- "Cybercrime Post-incident Leadership Model", 13th Midwest Association for Information Systems Conference, May 2018
- "Toward Understanding the Impact of Entrepreneurial Leadership Skills on Community Engagement", 6th International Conference on Innovation and Entrepreneurship, March 2018
