= Lushious Massacr =

American drag performer and makeup artist (born 1988)

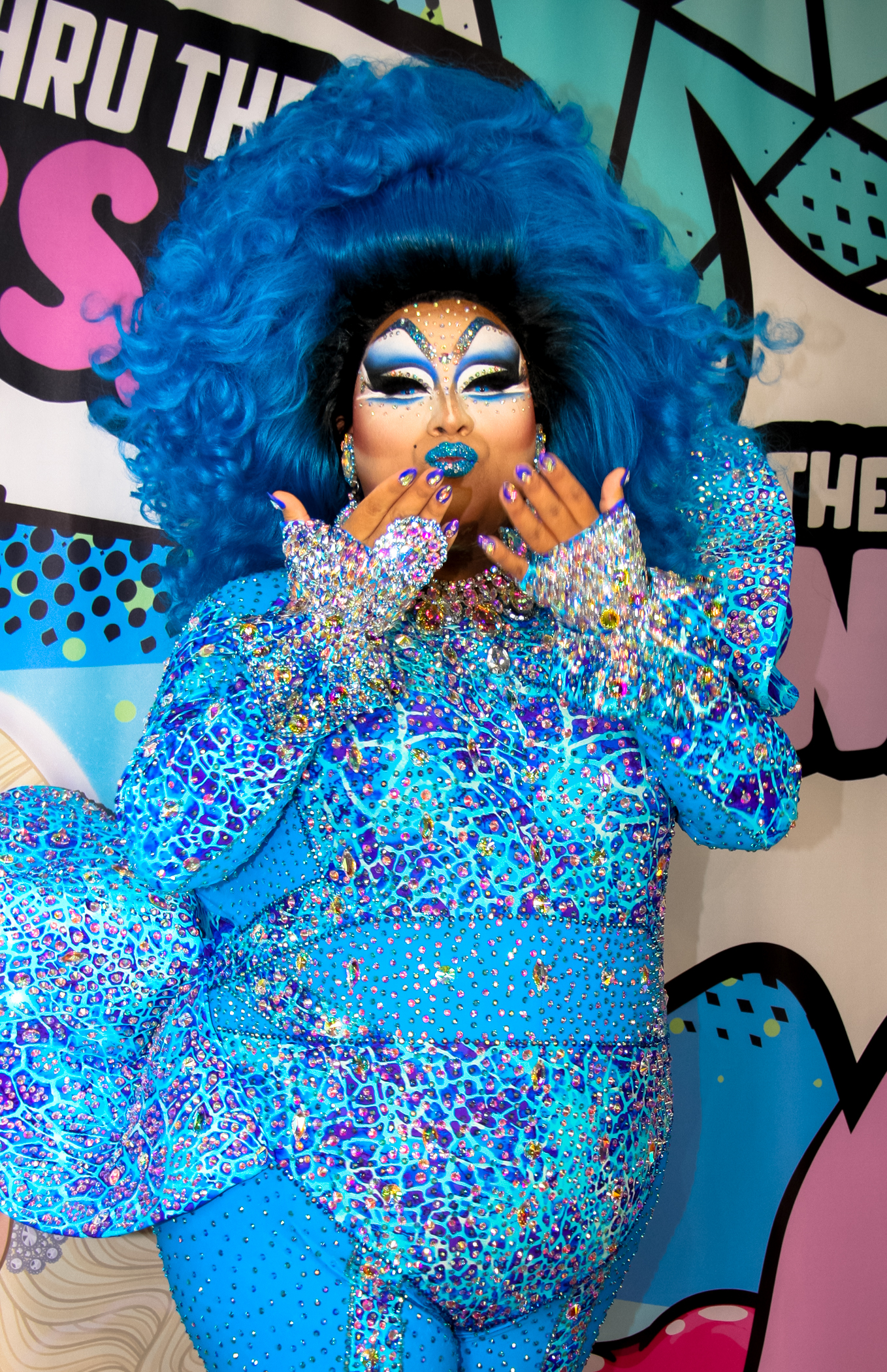
- Lushious Massacr at DragCon 2019
- Born: Martin De Luna Jr. 1 October 1988 (age 38); Brownsville, Texas, U.S.
- Occupations: Drag queen Makeup artist YouTuber
- Years active: 2010s–present
- Known for: Emmy Award-winning makeup artist on We're Here

Martin de Luna Jr., (born 1 October 1988), better known as Lushious Massacr, is a Mexican-American drag queen, professional makeup artist, and social media personality. She won the Primetime Emmy Award for Outstanding Makeup for a Variety, Nonfiction or Reality Program in 2022 for her work on the reality television series We're Here.

== Life and career ==
Born Martin De Luna Jr., Lushious Massacr is the eldest of four brothers and a native of Brownsville, Texas born to Mexican immigrant parents. She was born on 1 October 1988. As a child, she described herself as introverted, often going to school and then home without speaking to classmates or sometimes even teachers. Before pursuing her drag career, she worked in concessions at Cinemark movie theaters.

At age 19, she met drag mother Divina Garza, who helped her to develop confidence and begin exploring drag performance; the two made videos together around Brownsville. In her early years performing, her aesthetic leaned toward Club Kid-style drag, with an emphasis on elaborate, avant-garde looks. She subsequently moved to Houston to develop her drag career further, where she was mentored by drag performer Charro Beans DeBarge, who became influential in her artistic development and helped shape the persona that would become Lushious Massacr. After seven years in Houston, she returned to Brownsville.

In 2019, Lushious Massacr relocated to Los Angeles to pursue a career in the entertainment industry, where she met drag queen Valentina and her future drag daughter Mija Massacr. She returned to Brownsville approximately 10 months later. She has made it a goal to "prove that Mexican-American stories from South Texas are valuable", calling it her life's purpose. In 2025 Lushious Massacr permanently relocated to Los Angeles.

=== Makeup artistry ===
Lushious Massacr began her professional career working as a makeup artist for MAC Cosmetics. In 2019, she was selected as a member of the Sephora Squad, the beauty retailer's influencer program.

Her work on the HBO reality series We're Here, where she was a makeup artist for Shangela, earned her the Emmy Award for Outstanding Makeup for a Variety, Nonfiction or Reality Program in 2022. She shared this award with Jeremy Damion Austin and Tyler Devlin for the "Kona, Hawaii" episode. Shangela was sufficiently impressed by Lushious Massacr's work that she subsequently brought her on tour, where Lushious Massacr was present for engagements with figures including Vice President Kamala Harris and recording artist Bad Bunny. Shangela also advocated for Lushious Massacr to serve as her personal makeup artist when she competed on Season 31 of Dancing with the Stars (2022), successfully negotiating a star request with ABC and Disney on her behalf.

In 2023, Lushious Massacr served as the personal makeup artist for drag queen and television host Valentina during the first season of Drag Race México, the Mexican franchise of RuPaul's Drag Race.

=== Television and media ===
In 2016, Lushious Massacr was featured on the web series Transformations with James St. James, produced by World of Wonder Productions. She has also appeared as a judge on the reality competition series Drag Latina.

In September 2025, Lushious Massacr was featured in InStyle magazine's second annual Breakthrough List, a "selection of 30 ones-to-watch who are bound to make a meaningful, lasting impact in pop culture". In the interview, Lushious Massacr revealed that she will star, direct, produce, and write an upcoming Lifetime movie based on her life.

Also in 2025, Lushious Massacr was selected to inaugurate Interview magazine's advice column "Seek Help," in which she fielded reader-submitted questions on topics including love, relationships, and how to navigate personal hardship.

In 2026, Lushious Massacr was featured on the cover of PAPER magazine. She received a standalone cover and was also included on a group cover with John Waters, Margaret Cho, Chrishell Stause, Symone, Grant Knoche, Eli (musician), Mad Tsai, Madison Bailey, and Alicia Creti.

=== Social media ===
Lushious Massacr operates a YouTube channel and TikTok account featuring a series called "Dragvestigations", which she launched in 2024 with an inaugural video filmed at DD's Discounts in Brownsville. In the series, she visits retail establishments while in drag and provides comedic commentary, rating businesses on their accessibility to plus-size customers and drag performers and comedically searching for "trade". In these videos, she performs under the persona "Mimi", which she has described as a love letter to the women in her family, modeled after the Mexican women in her life: her mother, aunts, and grandmother. She has developed popular catchphrases ("brick!", "creature!", "don't do it little girl!", "crossdresser!", "bitter!") that have resonated with audiences. Her content has generated engagement from public figures including Frank Ocean, Marc Jacobs, Trixie Mattel, and Bob the Drag Queen. In 2026, Lushious Massacr collaborated with DJ VNSSA and Trixie Mattel on a reworked cover of the song Let's Have a Kiki by the Scissor Sisters.

=== Activism ===
The topics of immigration and immigrant rights are frequent mentions of activism in Lushious Massacr's content. In 2019, Lushious Massacr created a political commentary video at the Mexico–United States border wall in Brownsville, using makeup application as a form of protest against the Trump administration's immigration policies and the declaration of a national emergency at the border.

LGBTQ rights, specifically trans rights, are a major focus of Lushious Massacr's advocacy. In 2019, she commented on the case of Camila Díaz Córdova, a Salvadoran trans woman who was murdered in her home country after being deported from the U.S. following a rejected asylum petition. In March 2025, Lushious Massacr spoke at the Queer and Trans Liberation March in Dallas, where she addressed a crowd of hundreds gathered in response to anti-LGBTQ legislation and policies. In October 2025, Lushious Massacr was honored by the Los Angeles LGBT Center at its annual Queerceañera celebration. She has been recognized as part of the broader LGBTQ+ advocacy community in the Rio Grande Valley.

In May 2026, Lushious Massacr served as the keynote speaker at the 21st Annual Pride Grad Celebration at California State University, Los Angeles, hosted by the university's Gender & Sexuality Resource Center and the Cross Cultural Center. In June 2026, Lushious Massacr was a featured performer at the OUTLOUD Music Festival at WeHo Pride.

== Personal life ==
Lushious Massacr is the matriarch of the Haus of Massacr, a drag family in which she serves as drag mother to Mija Massacr and drag grandmother to Miz Tonz Massacr.

== Filmography ==
Year	Title	Role	Notes
2016	Transformations with James St. James	Herself	Web series episode
2022	We're Here	Makeup artist (Shangela)	"Kona, Hawaii" episode; Emmy Award winner
2022	Dancing with the Stars	Makeup artist (Shangela)	Season 31
2023	Drag Latina	Judge	Season 2
2023	Drag Race México	Makeup artist (Valentina)	Season 1

== Awards and honors ==
Them magazine featured Massacr in the magazine's Them Superlatives 2025, an award collection "for our favorite people made up by our favorite people". Massacr received the It Girl of the Year award; in the accompanying feature, conducted by actor Hari Nef, she discussed the origins of her drag name, the cultural significance of Dragvestigations as an act of queer visibility, and her philosophy of radical self-acceptance.

Year	Award	Category	Nominee(s)	Result	Ref.
2022	Primetime Emmy Awards	Outstanding Makeup for a Variety, Nonfiction or Reality Program	We're Here	Won	
2024	GLAAD Media Awards	Special Recognition (Spanish Language)	Drag Latina	Won	
2026	Queerty Awards	Digital Series	Dragvestigations	Won	
