= Ericka Hart =

American sex educator, model, and professor

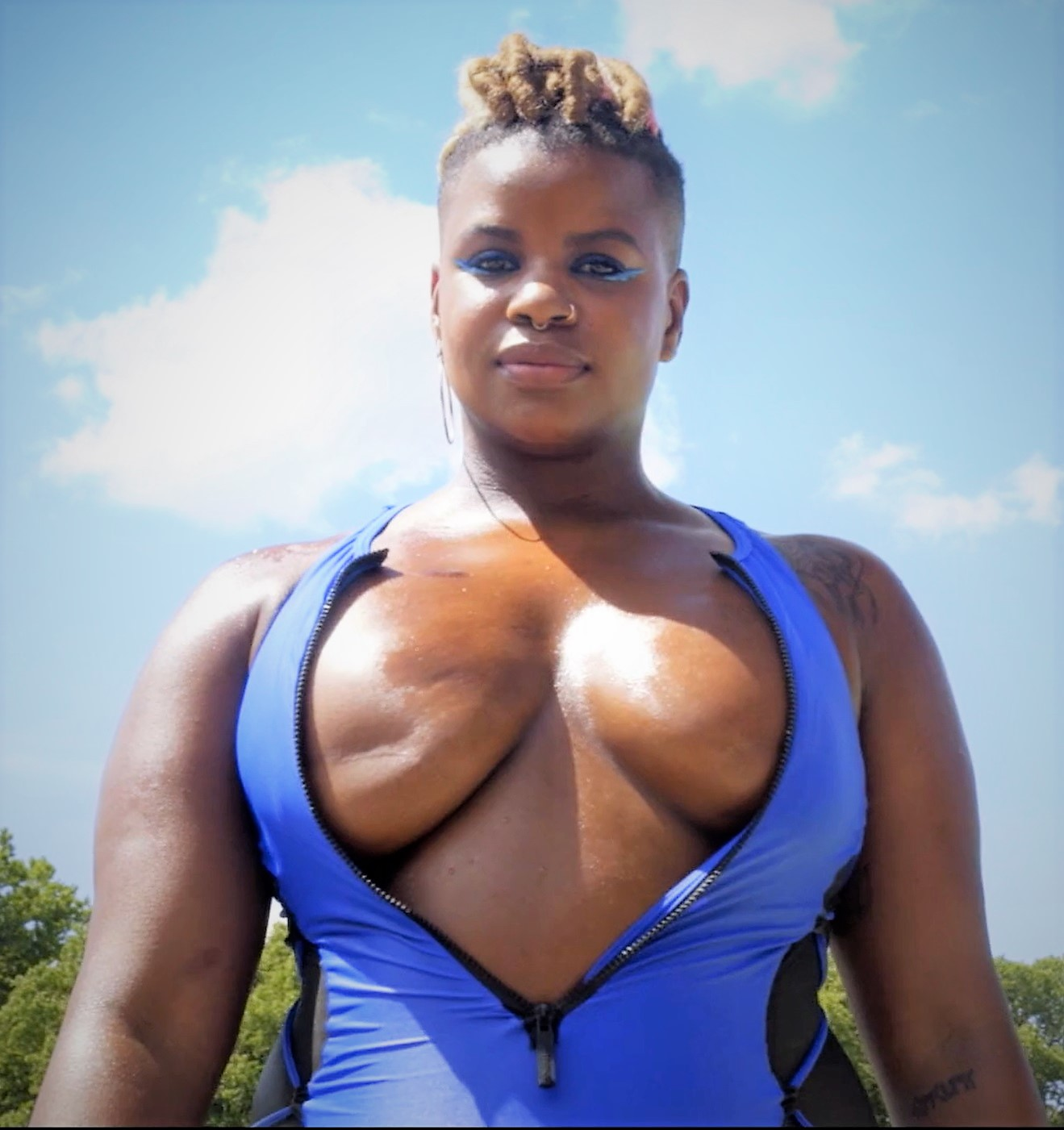
Hart advertising for Chromat in 2018.

Ericka Hart is an American academic, sex educator, and model.

== Early life ==
Hart's mother died of breast cancer when Hart was 13, prompting her family to move from Maryland to Puerto Rico. She (Note: Hart uses both she/her and they/them pronouns. This article uses she/her for consistency.) graduated from the University of Miami in 2008 with a degree in theater and psychology. Hart has a Master’s of Education in Human Sexuality from Widener University. From 2008 to 2010, Hart served as a HIV/AIDS volunteer in the Peace Corps in Ethiopia.

In May 2014, at age 28, Hart received a bilateral breast cancer diagnosis. She did not have access to health insurance at the time and worked for a year and a half while doing chemotherapy. Hart had a double mastectomy in June 2014 and went back to work two weeks later.

Hart went viral for attending the Afropunk Festival topless, showing scars from her double mastectomy. Hart commented on the under-diagnosing of breast cancer in Black women due to medical racism, and explained: "I wore my chest out because I wanted to raise awareness, but I also [...] still feel really sexy with my body this way, and I want to be received as sexy, not just as a survivor."

== Career ==
=== Columbia University teaching ===
Hart was an adjunct professor at the Columbia University School of Social Work, teaching human sexuality. She has taught sex education to audiences ranging from elementary-aged youth to adults. Difficulties trying to learn about sex as a child inspired her to become an educator. She told Forbes, "I just wanted to make people feel comfortable with asking about this topic.” Hart was recognized on The Root 100 in 2018 for her work as an "advocate for post-cancer body positivity."

Hart told Forbes she was pushed out of her teaching job at Columbia because she expressed concern about a student who made rape jokes in class and was transphobic and racist towards Hart. When Hart brought her concerns to Dean Melissa Begg and Associate Dean Julian Teitler during the spring 2020 semester, she was told her contract as an adjunct professor for the fall would not be renewed. Over 1,300 people signed a petition circulated by a student group calling for the resignation of three deans involved in the case. Hart spoke out against Columbia’s lack of support for adjunct professors, a larger percentage of whom are Black or Latino than full-time faculty. Hart demanded the school release the demographic information for adjunct and full-time faculty. In response, Begg posted stats to the school’s website showing THAT 18 percent of full-time staff are Black or Latino, while 36 percent of adjunct faculty are Black or Latino.

=== Modeling ===
Hart has posed topless for Paper magazine, Out magazine, and on the runway of ChromatFall 2018 show at New York Fashion Week. "Breast cancer is literally killing [queer and trans people of colour] and my hope is to inspire many people across a spectrum of gender identities," she told Vogue.

=== Other media ===
Hart co-hosts the podcast, Hoodrat to Headwrap: A Decolonized Podcast. Women's Health wrote: "Hosts Ericka Hart and Ebony Donnley allow their listeners to take part in an intimate conversation, sprinkled with comedic relief, glowing personalities, and radical seeds of self love."

In December 2022, Hinge hired Hart to offer advice on non-sexual forms of intimacy for asexual people.

== Personal life ==
Hart identifies as a queer nonbinary femme. She uses she/her and they/them pronouns. Hart is polyamorous.

At age 29, Hart married Emily Humphrey, a health coach she met while they were both serving in the Peace Corps in Ethiopia. Hart and Humphrey divorced a year and a half later.

Hart lives with her partner, Ebony Donnley, in Brooklyn, New York. Hart and Donnley met on Tinder. Donnley is a writer and audio engineer, and Hart's manager.

On February 14, 2023, Hart gave birth to their first child, East Francis Coltrane Hart-Donnley.
