= Emme (model) =

American model

Melissa Aronson
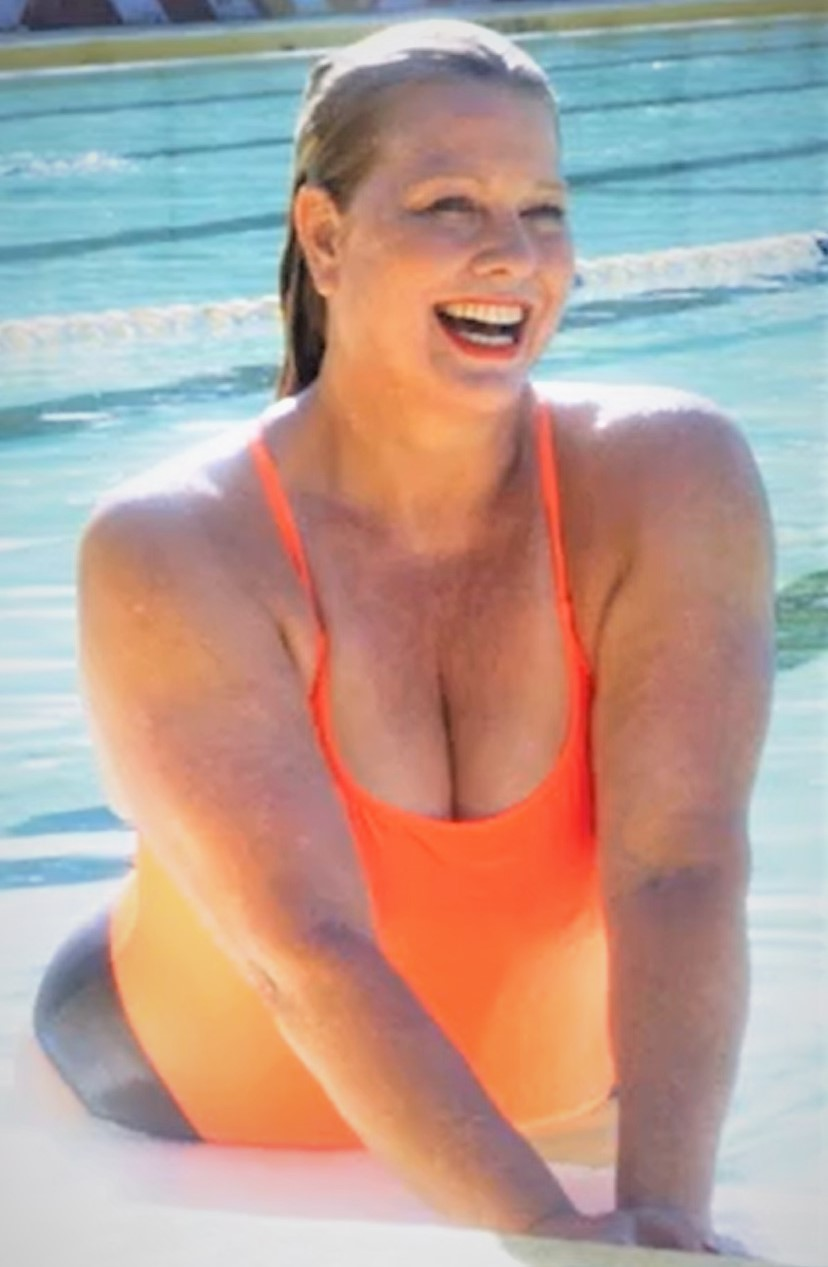
- Emme advertising for Chromat in 2018
- Born: Melissa Miller; June 30, 1963 (age 63); Manhattan, New York, U.S.
- Other names: Emme; Melissa Entwistle; Melissa Julian (On-Air TV Reporter)
- Education: Kent School; Syracuse University (BS)
- Occupations: TV Reporter (1986–1988); Model, Activist (1989–present); TV Personality (1994–present)
- Years active: 1989–present
- Height: 5 ft 11 in (1.80 m)
- Spouse(s): Phillip Aronson (m. 1989–2008; divorced)
- Children: 1
- Website: www.emmenation.com

Melissa Owens Miller (born June 30, 1963), known professionally as Emme, is an American plus-size model, social reformer and body image advocate. Emme gained worldwide fame as the first full-figured model chosen for People magazine's 50 Most Beautiful People, first in 1994, then for a second time in 1999. Emme is largely recognized in the 1990s as the leading model in the profession, as well as its highest earner.

== Early life ==
Born Melissa Miller in New York City, Emme was raised in Saudi Arabia, and returned to the United States as a teenager to attend Kent School in northwest Connecticut.

In her book, she tells the story of her stepfather instructing her at age 12 to strip down to her underwear while he took a black marker and drew circles on her outer thighs, hips, stomach and arms to highlight where she needed to lose weight.

Syracuse University awarded Emme a full athletic scholarship and she became a member of the crew team; she is also a member of the Syracuse University Orange Plus Hall of Fame, where she was inducted for her significant contribution to women's athletics and to the sport of rowing In addition, Emme was invited to the U.S. Olympic Team trials, as well as several U.S. National Team trials.

After graduating in 1985, she spent two years in Flagstaff, Arizona, where she was a reporter and morning anchor for the NBC affiliate KNAZ-TV.

== Career ==
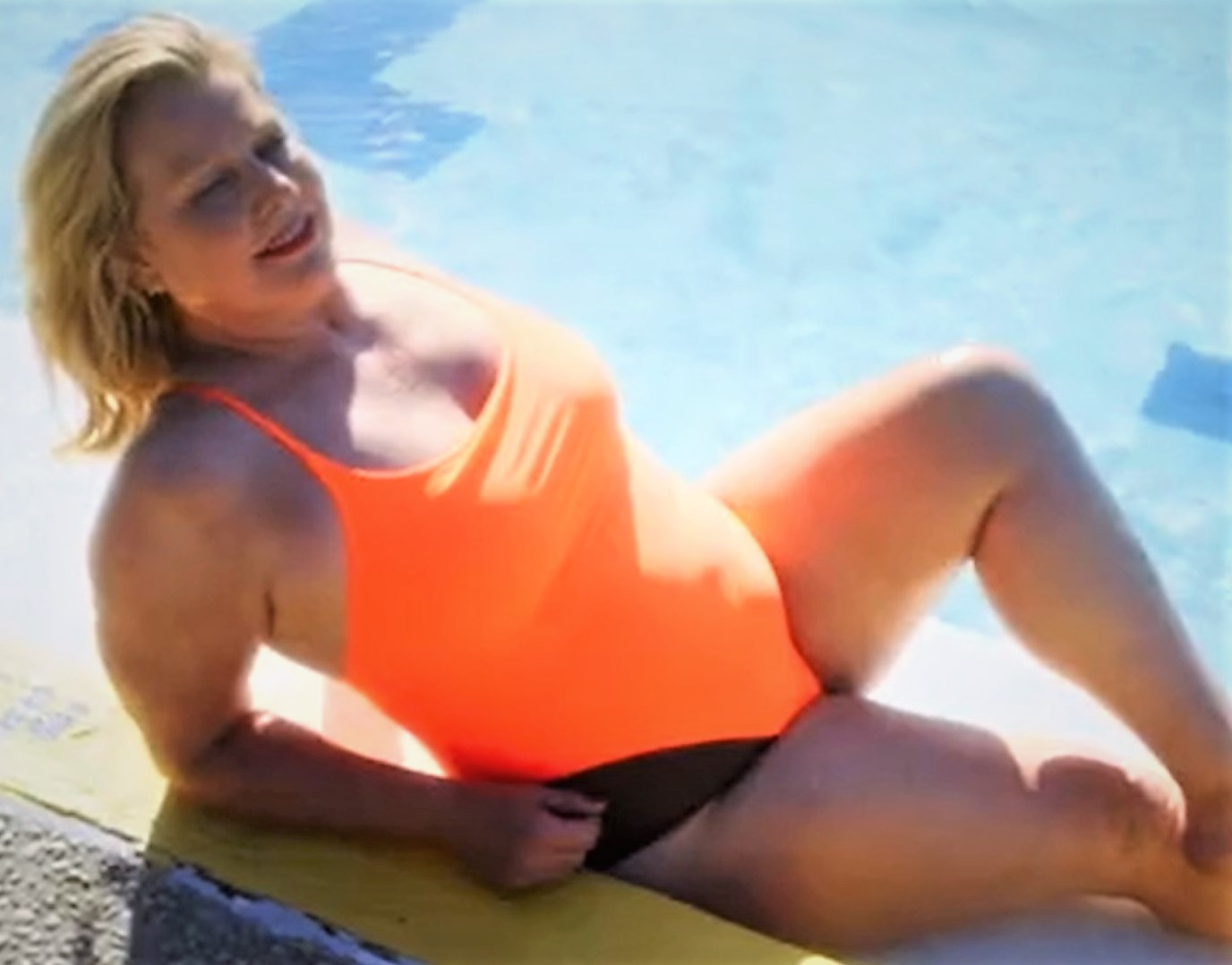
Emme for Chromat in 2018

In 1998, she was the first plus-size model to be a spokesperson for Revlon. Emme had a sportswear line of sized 2–26 women's clothing sold at QVC under the me BY EMME label and the Emme Collection sportswear line manufactured by Kellwood and sold to department stores.

A 16" collectible doll bearing Emme's name and likeness generates money to benefit body image and self-esteem organizations.

== Personal life ==
Emme's sister Melanie is also a model. Emme married Phillip Aronson in 1989 and moved to Closter, New Jersey. In 2001, Emme's daughter Toby was born. She separated from her husband in 2007, and later finalized her divorce in 2008. Emme's daughter Toby Cole was recently in Teen Vogue and is signed at IMG Models.

=== Cancer ===
In May 2007 Emme was diagnosed with Stage 2a Hodgkin's lymphoma – a type of lymphoma that is often curable with radiation and chemotherapy. She had surgery and in November 2007 doctors declared that she was "cancer-free".

== Awards ==
Award	Organization	Year
Hall of Fame	Syracuse University Orange Plus	1994
Woman of Distinction – New York	Girl Scouts of the USA	1997
S.A.R.A. Award	Syracuse University	2006
Letterwinner of Distinction	Syracuse University	2008
Hall of Fame	Syracuse Alumni Rowing Association	2013
Inspiration and Visionary Award	Women & Fashion FilmFest (WFF)	2015
Fashioning Futures for Women Award	Career Wardrobe	2015
