= Adore Me =

Women's intimates company in New York City

- Type: Subsidiary
- Founded: 2012; 14 years ago
- Founder: Morgan Hermand-Waiche
- Headquarters: New York, New York
- Products: Underwear, Lingerie, Swimwear
- Parent: Victoria's Secret
- Website: adoreme.com

Adore Me is a direct-to-consumer women's intimate apparel brand based in New York City. The company was started by Morgan Hermand-Waiche in 2010 while he was an MBA student at Harvard Business School and is a Certified B Corporation.

== History ==
Adore Me was founded by Morgan Hermand-Waiche. He got the idea of starting a lingerie company in 2010 during his second year at Harvard Business School's M.B.A program, when he could not find lingerie that was both high quality and affordable. Hermand-Waiche spent three years working at management consulting firm McKinsey & Company prior to Adore Me where he met Romain Liot, who joined with him at Adore Me. Gary Bravard joined early on as co-founder.

Initial investors in Adore Me include Hermand-Waiche's Harvard professors, and angel investors Fabrice Grinda and José Marín. The company officially launched its website in March 2012. In the same year, Adore Me raised $2.5 million in its second round of funding with investments from Redhills Ventures, Jaina Capital, Ventech Capital, and other US angel investors. Adore Me reportedly sold 100,000 items in their first year of business.

In July 2013, Adore Me raised $8.5 million from investors in a Series B round of funding. Investors included Upfront Ventures, Redhills Ventures, and Mousse Partners. This brought Adore Me's total funding to $11.2 million.

In 2014, Adore Me was listed as the second fastest-growing private retail company on the Inc. 5000 list based on their 2013 sales of $5.6 million. They went on to generate $16.2 million in sales in 2014.

In 2016, Adore Me was ranked #9 on Crain's list of New York's 50 Fastest-Growing Companies. Revenue for 2016 was $83.9 million.

In 2017, Adore Me was named one of the Internet Retailer Top 1000 companies from DigitalCommerce360 and was listed on the Inc. 5000 list for the third time in four years. As of 2017, Adore Me had 121 full-time employees.

In November 2022, it was announced Adore Me had been acquired by Victoria's Secret for $400 million USD. Victoria's Secret & Co made the decision to purchase Adore Me in part because of the subscription service, with the hope of retaining consumers beyond the traditional reliance of brand loyalty.

== Products and services ==
Initially, Adore Me products included lingerie, sleepwear, swimwear, and related apparel, including plus sizes. In October 2016, Adore Me launched an active wear collection, ranging in size from petite to plus. In April 2017, Adore Me announced their newest swim collection, with 88 pieces for standard and plus-sized women. Head of design, Helen Mears, formerly worked as head designer of the Angels brand at Victoria's Secret.

The brand has been compared to Zara regarding pricing and its practice of fast-fashion production. Adore Me primarily sells its products online. Customers shop through personalized "showrooms" and can purchase products a-la-carte on a one time basis or as part of a monthly subscription, known as "VIP Membership."

In December 2017, Adore Me launched their Bijou Collection. This luxury designer collection used fabrics such as velvet, French lace as well as gold logo plates and piercings.

As of July 2021, Adore Me carried various product categories, including bras and panties, lingerie, sleepwear, gifts, activewear, corsets and bralettes.

The company uses a style quiz and associated algorithm to recommend products and sizes to customers.

== Expansion into retail ==
In April 2016, Adore Me opened their first retail store as a showroom at their New York City headquarters. In June 2016, Adore Me partnered with Nordstrom to begin selling products in Nordstrom stores and on the company's e-commerce site. As of October 2016, Adore Me also partnered with Lord and Taylor to begin selling products in the Manhattan flagship store and online.

Adore Me opened its first permanent brick and mortar retail store in June, 2018. The first store was located in Staten Island Mall, NY, developed in partnership with Brookfield.

The store also has "smart" fitting rooms: the Adore Me customer can place an item, embedded with a radio frequency identification tag, on the hook in her fitting room to activate the fitting-room display screen. It will indicate the item chosen in full detail — revealing a product image, as well as size run and colors available.

On Black Friday of 2018, at 6 am Eastern, Adore Me opened its second retail store, located in Bridgewater Commons Mall, Bridgewater, NJ. The store is 3,600 square-foot in size — which is double the size of its first location which opened in June 2018 at Staten Island Mall, in the Staten Island borough of New York City. The larger store incorporates lounge areas to encourage involvement with the space. The two stores were designed by New York City-based Lawrence Group.

In 2018, it was reported that the company planned to open 300 stores during the upcoming five years. In April 2019, Adore Me opened its third retail location at Providence Place Mall in Providence, Rhode Island. In May 2019 a fourth location was opened in Willowbrook, New Jersey. Both of these locations are owned by Brookfield Properties.

== The Adore Me Group brands ==
2019 started a string of acquisitions and development of new brands.

In February 2019, Adore Me purchased maternity brand Belabumbum. Adore Me states that "the acquisition was part of Adore Me's strategy to boost further growth by broadening the product offering to serve new phases of a woman's life". Belabumbum offers intimate apparel, sleep, lounge, and activewear for expecting and new moms.

In June 2019, Adore Me launched its first satellite brand, called Walkpop, a brand specifically offering legwear, leggings, tights, and socks in a range of sizes, styles, and skin tones.

In January 2020, Adore Me launched period panties brand, Joyja. The panties come in sizes XS-4X. With the tagline "The Happy Period Panties," Joyja wants to bring more joy to "that time of the month" with bright colors, quirky prints, easy usage, and a significantly lower environmental impact than plastic tampons and pads. The brand also wants to improve access of period products for menstruating people in the US living below the poverty line. They do this through affordable pricing and by product donations

== Branding campaigns ==
During International Women's Day and the month of March 2019, Adore Me partnered with non-profit organization Girls Inc., which offered support, mentoring and guidance for girls. Adore Me sold a collection of panties featuring female-empowering prints with 100% of proceeds donated to Girls Inc.

In 2018, Adore Me conducted an artistic portrait series together with New York-based photojournalist Aude Adrien, highlighting women working at Adore Me, and their stories of how they got to where they are now, what inspires them, and how they define empowerment.

== TV appearances ==
Adore Me was featured on the final season of Project Runway: All Stars. Adore Me's Head Designer Helen Mears introduced the challenge for the third episode. The challenge was to create an outfit that used innerwear as outerwear, specifically, a corset. Christina Exie won the challenge and had her winning corset sold on AdoreMe.com after the episode aired.

== International expansion ==
Until 2017, Adore Me primarily focused on the North American market, delivering its products to all states in the U.S., as well as Canada, Australia, and the UK.

In September 2018, Adore Me officially announced its expansion to start selling in China. The brand has begun launching its products using the interactive livestream platform and global shopping marketplace service, ShopShops.

== Technology ==
Adore Me was one of the first retailers to use Google's Angular technology, a JavaScript-based, open-source, front-end web application framework, for its mobile and desktop websites.

Adore Me exploits its data on customer preferences from its Style Quiz in order to create a "personalized shopping experience". In 2018, Adore Me won a Nexty award for 'Best Use of Data in Marketing'.

Adore Me is the founder of New York Hearts Tech (NYHT), a community for tech-focused startups located in NYC.

Adore Me utilizes Kubernetes in its proprietary software tools — the open-source system for automating deployment, scaling, and management of containerized applications. Adore Me is an early adopter of the system and hosts regular meetups in their European HQ for other practitioners, aiming to share knowledge about emerging technologies.

== Models ==
Adore Me has promoted "body positivity" and "inclusivity" within the brand. They have worked with models such as Iskra Lawrence, a spokesmodel for body positive campaigns; transgender influencer Rose Montoya; and Nina Agdal, a Sports Illustrated swimsuit model; In 2016 Adore Me worked with plus model Sophie Tweed-Simmons.

On February 4, 2021, Adore Me took to its Twitter account to claim that TikTok "was openly built with discrimination at its core." They claimed that several videos that featured African-American and Hispanic-American models, as well as videos with Caucasian models who are not supermodels, were removed from the platform. Adore Me's vice president of strategy, Ranjan Roy, explained that the models sending content for the brand to use on TikTok would then ask if they needed to supply a video with them modeling more or different lingerie sets. He expressed his frustration that the social media platform was putting such pressure on the company's models.

== Adore Me Services ==
Adore Me owns and operates its own distribution center, Adore Me Services (AMS), based in Secaucus, New Jersey. The brand opened the new distribution center in January 2019. According to Morgan Hermand-Waiche, building the new center would support the fulfillment of product to the stores. The opening of AMS was part of the company's second phase into expanding internationally. The solution combines a high-density robotic storage and order picking system with automated put walls and conveyor belts.

Hermand-Waiche stated in a 2020 post to the Adore Me group on Medium that AMS was one of the "most rewarding decisions we've ever made" because it allowed the company to move towards sustainability more quickly, it facilitated the launch and fulfillment of Adore Me's satellite brands, and it helped the try-at-home service become "the fastest-growing segment" of the company's revenue.

== Customer service ==
Customer reviews are visible and available for each product on adoreme.com, assisting customers to see product fit, satisfaction and beyond.

Adore Me received Retail TouchPoints' Customer Engagement Awards' in 2017 and 2018. The brand won the Excellence Awards as Best in 2018 Class Omnichannel Experience during Customer Contact Week.

In December 2017, the company implemented a hybrid-bot on its website. The hybrid-bot enables Adore Me customers to receive live support via several messaging platforms.

Before securing series B funding, Hermand-Waiche went on record stating that the company had 50,000 members with double that number in visits to the website each month. He stated that the revenue had been increasing by 40 percent each month from January through June 2012. At that time, the company model provided an individual showroom for each customer consisting of "bras, briefs, babydolls, slips, underwear, corsets, bustiers, shapewear, legwear and swimwear," with the sixth set purchased being free for members.

Once fully funded, reports emerged detailing customer complaints about the implementation of the controversial practice of negative option billing. Adore Me offered the customers the choice of buying a product at full price or of buying the same product at a substantial discount by joining a membership club. The club then billed customers a fixed amount each month unless the customer bought lingerie or opted out for the month. While the membership may be cancelled, the customers have found it difficult to cancel. Customer Kathy Lira filed suit against Adore Me seeking damages, injunctive relief, and court costs as restitution for the financial damages incurred from having her card automatically billed. Following an investigation filed by the Federal Trade Commission about Adore Me's deceptive billing practices, the company agreed to refund up to $1.38 million to customers that had previously forfeited their store credits and to clearly disclose how much customers would pay on its monthly subscription plan.

In 2017, Adore Me announced the launch of its scholarship program, offering a $1,000 scholarship to support women pursuing a degree in business. The company began awarding female students who had either started their own business or were planning to do so in the future.

In 2022, Adore Me became the first US-based lingerie brand to be granted certification by B Lab, a nonprofit assessing company performance in order to determine corporate sustainability. Adore Me announced the certification saying they were "on a mission" to make shopping "more accessible to all consumers". The company faces a potential class action lawsuit related to the Americans with Disabilities Act. As of April 7, 2023, Kevin Yan Luis has filed suit in the Southern District of New York claiming that the site cannot be accessed by the visually impaired. A similar suit filed June 27, 2022 by Marta Hanyzkiewicz was dismissed with prejudice by Judge Nina Gershon on November 21, 2022.

In 2023, the company was once again sued for deceptive billing practices, this time by thirty-one states and the District of Columbia. Included in the plaintiffs' arguments was that consumers who cancelled their membership in the VIP program were required to forfeit all of the accrued store credits in doing so. These credits had been accumulated through the monthly billing of the VIP program and consumers not having made a purchase between the first and the sixth of the month. They settled the case in June 2023 for $2.35 million, to be split amongst the plaintiffs.
