= Lyon Building =

Historic building in Seattle, Washington, U.S.

- U.S. National Register of Historic Places
- Seattle Landmark
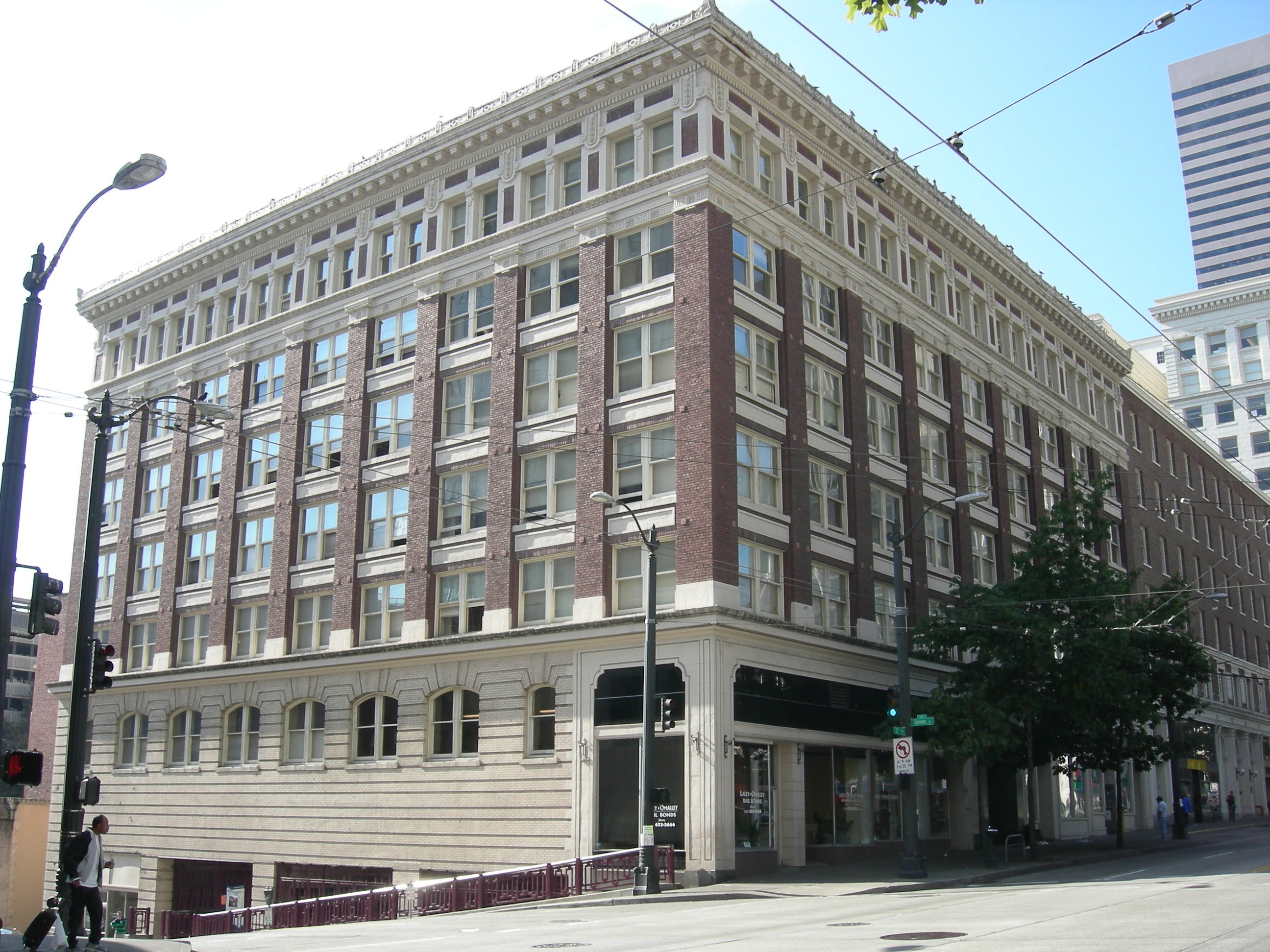
- Viewed from the southeast in 2007

- Location within Downtown Seattle
- Location: 607 Third Ave., Seattle, Washington, U.S.
- Coordinates: 47°36′10.2″N 122°19′54.8″W
- Area: less than one acre
- Built: 1910
- Architect: Graham, John, Sr.; Myers, David J.
- Architectural style: Chicago school
- NRHP reference No.: 95000806

Significant dates
- Added to NRHP: June 30, 1995
- Designated SEATL: August 16, 1996

The Lyon Building is a historic building located at 607 Third Avenue in Downtown Seattle, Washington, United States. It was built in 1910 by the Yukon Investment Company and was named after the city of Lyon, France, reflecting the French heritage of the company's owners. It was designed by the firm of Graham & Myers in the Chicago school style of architecture and was built by the Stone & Webster engineering firm, whose use of non-union labor would make the yet unfinished building the target of a bombing by notorious union activist James B. McNamara, who would commit the deadly Los Angeles Times bombing only 1 month after. The Lyon Building, however, was not destroyed due to its substantial construction, and after a small delay, it was completed in 1911 and soon became one of Seattle's most popular office addresses for lawyers and judges due to its proximity to Seattle's public safety complex and the King County Courthouse.

It was the founding location of many foreign consuls, social and political clubs as well as the City University of Seattle. The building's basement now serves as an entrance the Pioneer Square station of the Seattle Transit Tunnel. The Lyon Building was added to the National Register of Historic Places on June 30, 1995 and was designated a Seattle landmark on August 16, 1996. In 1997 it was converted to residential use as a shelter and services center for the homeless and at-risk by the non-profit Downtown Emergency Service Center, who are the current owners of the building.

== History ==
=== Background ===
The double lot at the Northwest corner of Third Avenue and James Street was originally the site of the home of Bailey Gatzert (1829-1893), 8th mayor of Seattle (1875–76) and one of the city's leading businessmen in the 19th century as a partner in the Schwabacher Brothers hardware company. Gatzert had his home constructed in 1875 during his term as mayor and it was one of the most elegant houses in the city at the time. The Gatzerts would play host to president Rutherford B. Hayes at the home during his visit to the city in the Fall of 1880. In 1892, following the lead of other wealthy Seattleites, Gatzert and his wife Barbetta purchased an entire block on First Hill with plans to build a new mansion after returning from a vacation to Europe but Gatzert would die on the boat before making it back home in April 1893. That property would eventually be donated to the Roman Catholic Archdiocese of Seattle who would construct the St. James Cathedral on the site. After Gatzert's passing, his widow moved out of the house and later out of the city all together. Their old home was turned into lodgings and the grounds around it would gradually be filled in with a hodgepodge of small brick buildings, rendering the old house unrecognizable.

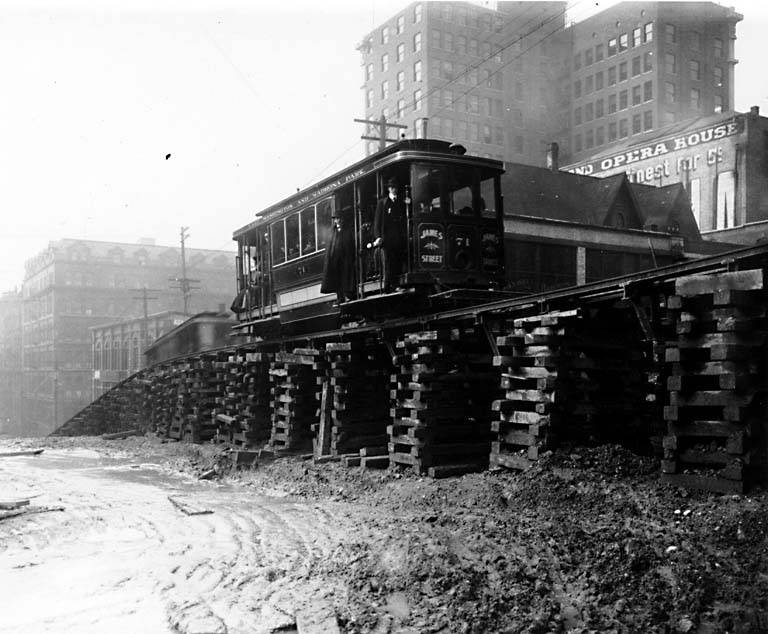
The Gatzert corner during the 3rd Avenue regrade c.1903-4.

The property was purchased from the Gatzert Estate for $70,000 in September 1901 by a syndicate headed by William E. Stevens of the Stevens Hotel Company (which managed the Hotel Seattle, among others), who intended to build a 10-story fireproof hotel on the site. Plans were prepared by Saunders and Lawton with a working title of "The New Hotel Seattle" and elaborate perspective drawings were published in local newspapers, but because of the odd slope of Third Avenue at the site and the city's constant delays in regrading it, the project stalled before the hotel could even get an official name. After having refused several offers, in May 1905 Stevens' syndicate sold the property to capitalist Raymond Auzias de Turenne, then the French Vice-consul at Dawson, YT for $150,000. Turenne soon formed the Yukon Investment Company that would be in charge of developing new buildings and properties around the city. Due to continuing uncertainty and poor communication from city leaders about the regrading and widening of Third Avenue, the property remained unimproved and the increasingly ramshackle corner was beginning to be seen as a public nuisance and a fire trap.

"We had planned a skyscraper for this corner costing $400,000 or more but we will not build until we know what move the city of Seattle will make next. When we improved this property 16 months ago the city officials informed us that the street line would remain as it then was. Since then the city has widened the street and we are now tearing down the work constructed less than two years ago." - R. Auzias Turenne, June 1908

=== The Lyon Building ===
In February 1910 during a whirlwind of new construction in the city, the Yukon Investment Company announced that they were finally ready to build; proposing a substantial $500,000 building on the site. They commissioned architects Graham & Myers to design a 6-story reinforced concrete office building clad in brick and terracotta, which would be shorter than the previous buildings planned there. The resulting design was a mixture of Chicago school and Beaux-arts styles. A special feature of the building would be an interior court as wide as Third Avenue. Turenne named the building after Lyon, France in honor of the French heritage he and many others involved in his investment company shared. The contract for construction was soon awarded to the nationally renowned Stone & Webster engineering corporation who were known as an "open shop" firm, meaning they used non-union labor on all their jobs; a point of contention amongst national labor unions that would make them a target of union activists. Demolition of the old Gatzert House and the warren of surrounding shops began in March and the building was begun the following month.

==== Labor disputes and the McNamara bombing ====
On the night of August 31, 1910, an explosion shook the unfinished building just as nearby theaters were letting out, throwing pedestrians to the ground and shattering nearly every window, including those of a passing street car, in a two-block radius, sending shards of glass raining to the sidewalks. The Lyon Building's windows had not yet been installed so the explosion vented freely. The wooden floors had recently been installed though and had all been blown loose. After the dust had settled it was discovered by the police that several 6-inch deep holes had been bored into the basement wall of the elevator shaft and surrounding columns where Nitroglycerin had been placed. Though over $5,000 in damage was caused by the explosion there were no deaths, no fire was caused by the explosion, and the location of the bomb in a non-vulnerable area in the building prevented any major structural damage and was confined to the basement. The building's construction, which had already been delayed by two months due to material shortages, had to be delayed further to completely rebuild the elevator shaft and most of the plumbing that had been mangled in the explosion.

A police investigation was immediately begun but there was little physical evidence found. A disgruntled laborer was suspected in the attack and according to Police chief Charles Wappenstein there were reports of at least 5 "roughly dressed" men seen near the building the evening of the explosion. Governor Marion E. Hay offered a reward of $250 to catch the culprits, with Stone & Webster contributing an additional $2,500 soon after. About a week after the explosion a civilian thwarted an alleged bombing attempt on a Chinese-owned business in Pioneer Square by several men matching the description of the Lyon buildings suspects but they were able to escape before police arrived. This incident was later found to be unrelated.

Exactly 30 days after the Lyon Building bombing was the infamous Los Angeles Times bombing of October 1, 1910, which killed 20 non-union newspaper employees and raised questions among local law enforcement of whether the two bombings were related and whether the suspects hadn't fled the city immediately. By the time the McNamara Brothers were arrested for the LA bombings in April 1911, the Lyon case was still unsolved with a reward now reaching $5,000 but revelations in the ensuing inquisition would soon prove them correct. California authorities revealed through questioning that James B. McNamara had confessed to being in Seattle on the night of the explosion, having checked into a cottage in the rear of 1020 6th Ave on August 19 under the alias of J.B. Bryce but referring to himself as "Petervitch". He would spend the following week in the city buying supplies and building a bomb that could be detonated by electric spark and while posing as an amateur miner, attended explosive classes and even took pieces of his device to an electric shop directly across the street from the Lyon Building for repairs. He would use the knowledge gained in Seattle to carry out the bombings in Los Angeles. McNamara also confessed to having acted alone in the bombing, despite evidence that he was being shadowed by an accomplice and had support from local iron workers union leadership; the motive being retaliation against Stone & Webster's non-union labor policies.

At the nationwide bombing conspiracy trial in Indianapolis, J.H. McCormick, the keeper of the lodge McNamara had stayed at under an alias, offered damning testimony of his comings and goings from his room that coordinated with both the Seattle and LA bombings: that he had witnessed much suspicious behavior from the man, him returning from the scene of the explosion as well as the discovery of an alarm clock (of the type used in other bombings) stashed behind a wall in his room after he had left on September 18. McNamara and his accomplices would plead guilty to all charges by the end of 1911, but the investigation into higher-ups in the conspiracy continued and several Seattle union leaders would eventually face charges.

==== Completion and later years ====
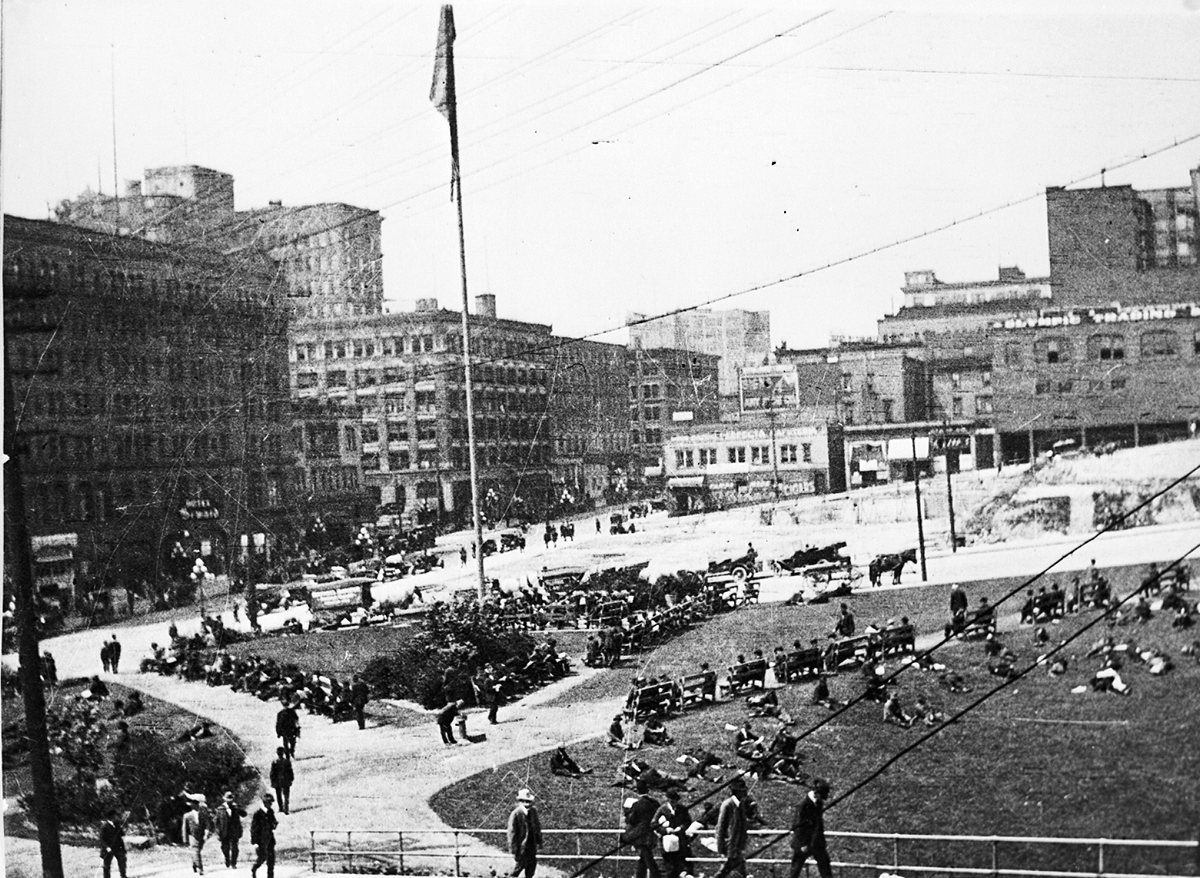
The future site of the King County Courthouse c.1911, the recently completed Lyon Building is at center.

The Lyon Building was finally completed in March 1911. Among the first tenants to move in was the Brown-Powell Liquor Company's restaurant and the Seattle Patricians Club. The upstairs offices became a popular address for lawyers, bail bondsmen and process servers even before the King County Courthouse was built across the intersection of James Street. In September 1911 the L'alliance Nationale, the strongest French-Canadian fraternal society on the continent, opened their first Pacific Coast cercle in the building, Cercle Tobiac No. 301. Building owner Auzias-Turenne, with strong French-Canadian connections, became its president. Another club opened in the building relevant to its owner was the Alaskan Square Deal League, a place where "All Alaskans were invited to call and make this office their headquarters". Architect Graham would locate his office in the building not long after completion, the first of several architects who would over the years including William Mallis, Joseph Cote and Stoddard & Son. Seattle's stock exchange was located in the building for about a year and the local headquarters of the Democratic Party were located in the building throughout the 1910s.

R. Auzias de Turenne died in 1941 and ownership of the Yukon Investment Company and its properties including the Lyon Building was passed to his son Leon. During this time the corner was occupied by the Hi-Hat Waffle bar, a popular breakfast spot for courthouse employees and lawyers. Leon died in 1957 but the company continued to operate into the late 1980s and the Lyon Building was always kept up to date with modern office space needs. City University of Seattle was founded on the building's fourth floor in 1973 by Dr. Michael A. Pastore to provide higher education for working adults.

In the 1980s the Lyon Building was chosen as a site for one of the entrances to the Pioneer Square Station of the Seattle Transit Tunnel. Instead of demolishing the building, the basement level at James Street, last used for retail, was rebuilt to accommodate the station facilities. By the 1990s the building was owned by King County at which time it was nominated for inclusion in the National Register of Historic Places and it was officially listed on June 30, 1995 and one year later became a city of Seattle landmark. During this time the building was converted into housing and a center for services for the homeless by the Downtown Emergency Service Center. It was sold in November 1995 for $1,500,000 to the Lyon Building Limited Partnership who transferred it to the DESC in 2012, who are the current owners and tenants of the building.

== See also ==
- List of Seattle landmarks
- National Register of Historic Places listings in Seattle, Washington
