= Fluide =

Cosmetics company

- Industry: Fashion
- Founded: 2018
- Founder: Laura Kraber; Isabella Giancarlo
- Headquarters: Brooklyn, United States
- Products: Cosmetics
- Website: www.fluide.us

Fluide, also known as We Are Fluide, is an American online cosmetics and beauty company headquartered in Brooklyn, New York. The company offers a collection of cruelty-free makeup that they state is aimed at all gender expressions, gender identities, and skin tones.

== History ==
Fluide launched online in January 2018 and was founded by Laura Kraber and Isabella Giancarlo, the latter of whom also served as creative director. Kraber came up with the idea of Fluide after noticing that there was an absence of queer beauty brands. She further noted that "In beauty, queers are often forgotten, unless they’re trotted out to be trendy or pandered to by huge corporations during Pride."

She has also stated that the company has designed their packaging to "not be extremely masculine or feminine" and that they "discard those notions generally because our whole belief is that gender is more of a constellation than an extreme of one or the other ... If makeup is joyful and transformative and fun, nobody should be left out.” The company's products use the tagline "makeup for everyone".

== Products ==
The company sells cosmetic products such as liquid lipsticks, nail polishes, eyeshadows, and loose glitters.

== Media ==
Fluide donates five percent of profits to organizations that support health and legal rights in the LGBTQ+ community. Fluide donates products to fundraisers and events to support LGBTQ+ organizations such as the Callen-Lorde Community Health Center and Sylvia Rivera Law Project.

== Models and spokespeople ==
The company has enlisted models by scouting on the street and has featured several spokespeople known for their presence in the LGBT world. The actress Freckle, who is gender non-conforming, became one of the company's beauty brand ambassadors in 2018. Other people who have participated in Fluide's campaigns include Desmond Napoles, Rose Montoya, and Jacob Tobia. Fluide has received praise for this from outlets such as Bustle.
