= We're Here =

American television series

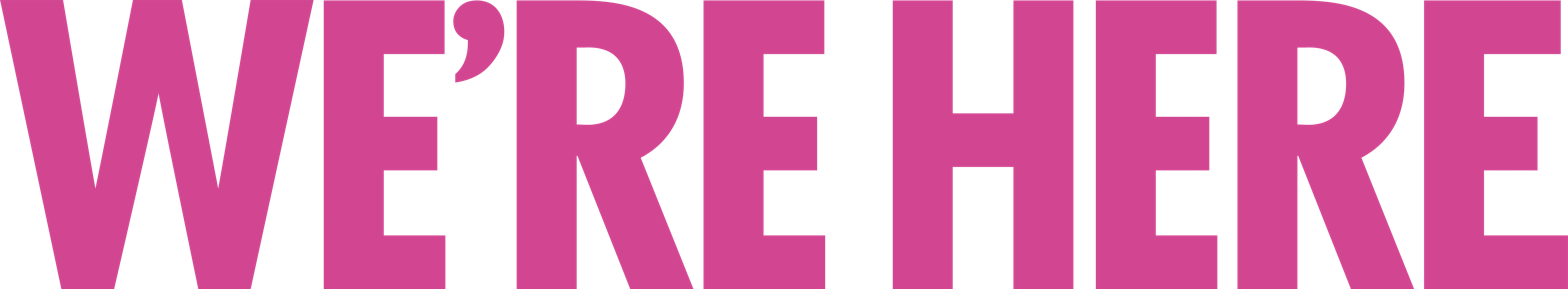
- Genre: Reality television
- Created by: Stephen Warren; Johnnie Ingram
- Starring: Bob the Drag Queen; Eureka O'Hara; Shangela; Jaida Essence Hall; Priyanka; Sasha Velour; Latrice Royale
- Opening theme: "I Am America" by Shea Diamond
- Country of origin: United States
- Original language: English
- No. of seasons: 4
- No. of episodes: 26

Production
- Executive producers: Stephen Warren; Johnnie Ingram; Peter LoGreco; Eli Holzman; Aaron Saidman; Erin Gamble
- Production companies: HBO Entertainment; House of Opus 20; The Intellectual Property Corporation

Original release
- Network: HBO
- Release: April 23, 2020 – May 31, 2024

We're Here is a HBO reality television series featuring former Drag Race contestants, documenting the drag queens as they travel across the United States to recruit small-town residents to participate in one-night-only drag shows. The show premiered on April 23, 2020.

In September 2024, the series was cancelled after broadcasting four seasons.

== Cast ==
- Bob the Drag Queen (seasons 1–3)
- Eureka O'Hara (seasons 1–3)
- Shangela (seasons 1–3)
- Jaida Essence Hall (season 4)
- Priyanka (season 4)
- Sasha Velour (season 4)
- Latrice Royale (season 4)

== Production ==
HBO announced the six-part reality television series on November 5, 2019, to star former RuPaul's Drag Race contestants Bob the Drag Queen, Eureka O'Hara, and Shangela. We're Here was created by Stephen Warren and Johnnie Ingram, and is executive produced by Warren, Ingram, Peter LoGreco, Eli Holzman and Aaron Saidman. LoGreco also directs. Caldwell Tidicue (Bob the Drag Queen), Eureka D. Huggard (Eureka O'Hara) and D.J. Pierce (Shangela Laquifa Wadley) serve as consulting producers. HBO EVP of Programming Nina Rosenstein said, "Drag is about confidence and self expression. We are so thrilled to showcase the transformative power of the art form with our audience." On February 19, 2020, it was announced that We're Here would premiere on April 23, 2020.

The final episode of the first season, which was slated to be set in Spartanburg, South Carolina, was halted by the imposition of lockdowns due to the COVID-19 pandemic in the United States. The episode instead became a Zoom-based discussion among the three hosts about their own personal journeys through drag.

On June 5, 2020, HBO renewed the series for a second season which premiered on October 11, 2021. The second season launched with a return to Spartanburg. On December 16, 2021, HBO renewed the series for a third season which premiered on November 25, 2022. On July 12, 2023 it was announced that the series would be returning for a fourth season but with new queens: Jaida Essence Hall, Priyanka, and Sasha Velour. On September 6, 2023, it was reported that Latrice Royale has joined the cast of the fourth season.

On September 6, 2024, it was announced that HBO had cancelled the series.

== Episodes ==
=== Series overview ===
Season	Episodes	Originally released	
Season	Episodes	First released	Last released
1	6	April 23, 2020	June 4, 2020
2	8	October 11, 2021	November 29, 2021
3	6	November 25, 2022	December 30, 2022
4	6	April 26, 2024	May 31, 2024

=== Season 1 (2020) ===
No. overall	No. in season	Title	Directed by	Original release date	U.S. viewers (millions)
1	1	"Gettysburg, Pennsylvania"	Peter LoGreco	April 23, 2020	0.122
2	2	"Twin Falls, Idaho"	Peter LoGreco	April 30, 2020	N/A
3	3	"Branson, Missouri"	Peter LoGreco	May 7, 2020	0.103
4	4	"Farmington, New Mexico"	Peter LoGreco	May 14, 2020	0.130
5	5	"Ruston, Louisiana"	Peter LoGreco	May 21, 2020	0.070
6	6	"Spartanburg, We Make It Werk"	Peter LoGreco	June 4, 2020	0.113

=== Season 2 (2021) ===
No. overall	No. in season	Title	Directed by	Original release date	U.S. viewers (millions)
7	1	"Spartanburg, South Carolina"	Peter LoGreco	October 11, 2021	N/A
8	2	"Temecula, California"	Peter LoGreco	October 18, 2021	N/A
9	3	"Del Rio, Texas"	Peter LoGreco	October 25, 2021	N/A
10	4	"Selma, Alabama"	Peter LoGreco	November 1, 2021	N/A
11	5	"Evansville, Indiana"	Peter LoGreco	November 8, 2021	N/A
12	6	"Watertown, South Dakota"	Peter LoGreco	November 15, 2021	N/A
13	7	"Kona, Hawaii"	Peter LoGreco	November 22, 2021	N/A
14	8	"Grand Junction, Colorado"	Peter LoGreco	November 29, 2021	N/A

=== Season 3 (2022) ===
No. overall	No. in season	Title	Directed by	Original release date	U.S. viewers (millions)
15	1	"Granbury, Texas"	Peter LoGreco	November 25, 2022	N/A
16	2	"Jackson, Mississippi"	Peter LoGreco	December 2, 2022	N/A
17	3	"St. George, Utah"	Peter LoGreco	December 9, 2022	N/A
18	4	"Sussex, New Jersey"	Peter LoGreco	December 16, 2022	N/A
19	5	"Florida, Part 1"	Peter LoGreco	December 23, 2022	N/A
20	6	"Florida, Part 2"	Peter LoGreco	December 30, 2022	N/A

=== Season 4 (2024) ===
No. overall	No. in season	Title	Directed by	Original release date	U.S. viewers (millions)
21	1	"Tennessee, Part 1"	Peter LoGreco	April 26, 2024	N/A
22	2	"Tennessee, Part 2"	Peter LoGreco	May 3, 2024	N/A
23	3	"Tennessee, Part 3"	Peter LoGreco	May 10, 2024	N/A
24	4	"Oklahoma, Part 1"	Peter LoGreco	May 17, 2024	N/A
25	5	"Oklahoma, Part 2"	Peter LoGreco	May 24, 2024	N/A
26	6	"Oklahoma, Part 3"	Peter LoGreco	May 31, 2024	N/A

== Reception ==
=== Awards and nominations ===
We're Here is a 2022 recipient of the Peabody Award for entertainment. The Peabody's governing body, in its May 2023 award announcement, highlighted the series' offering of "poignant and show-stopping performances," and for its embrace of drag as "a form of artistic protest" at a time when the art form faces attempts by conservative activists and lawmakers to regulate or restrict it.

Year	Award	Category	Nominee(s)	Result	Ref.
2020	Primetime Emmy Awards	Outstanding Unstructured Reality Program	We're Here	Nominated	
2020	TCA Awards	Outstanding Achievement in Reality Programming	We're Here	Nominated	
2020	Dorian Awards	Best LGBTQ TV Show	We're Here	Nominated	
2021	Independent Spirit Awards	Best New Non-Scripted or Documentary Series	We're Here	Nominated	
2021	GLAAD Media Awards	Outstanding Reality Program	We're Here	Won	
2021	Queerty Awards	TV series	We're Here	Runner-up	
2022	Queerty Awards	Reality / Docuseries	We're Here	Runner-up	
2022	GLAAD Media Awards	Outstanding Reality Program	We're Here	Won (Note: tied with RuPaul's Drag Race)	
2022	Primetime Emmy Awards	Outstanding Costumes for Variety, Nonfiction, or Reality Programming	Casey Caldwell, Diego Montoya, Joshua "Domino" Schwartz, Marco Marco, and Patryq Howell (for "Evansville, Indiana")	Won	
2022	Primetime Emmy Awards	Outstanding Makeup for a Variety, Nonfiction or Reality Program	Jeremy Damion Austin, Martin "Lushious" De Luna Jr., and Tyler "Laila" Devlin (for "Kona, Hawaii")	Won	
2022	Peabody Award	Entertainment	We're Here	Won	
2022	Dorian Awards	Best Reality Show	We're Here	Nominated	
2023	GLAAD Media Awards	Outstanding Reality Program	We're Here	Won	
2023	Queerty Awards	Reality/Docu-series	We're Here	Runner-up	
2023	Primetime Emmy Awards	Outstanding Costumes for Variety, Nonfiction, or Reality Programming	Diego Montoya, Marco Morante, Joshua "Domino" Schwartz, Blake Danford, Sharon Malka, and Ricky Reynoso (for "St. George, Utah")	Won	
2023	Primetime Emmy Awards	Outstanding Hairstyling for a Variety, Nonfiction or Reality Program	Abdiel "Gloria" Urcullu and Tyler Funicelli (for "St. George, Utah")	Won	
2024	TCA Awards	Outstanding Achievement in Reality Programming	We're Here	Nominated	
2024	Primetime Emmy Awards	Outstanding Hairstyling for a Variety, Nonfiction or Reality Program	Abdiel "Gloria" Urcullu and Tyler Funicelli (for "Oklahoma, Part 3")	Nominated	
2024	Primetime Emmy Awards	Outstanding Makeup for a Variety, Nonfiction or Reality Program	Tyler "Laila" Devlin and Kalyd Sebastian Odeh (for "Oklahoma, Part 3")	Nominated	
2025	Costume Designers Guild Awards	Excellence in Variety, Reality-Competition, and Live Television	Diego Montoya, Marco Morante, Derek Anthony Purcell and Amber Watkins (for "Oklahoma, Part 3")	Pending	
