= Amal Ammar =

Egyptian judge

- أمل عمار

President of the National Council for Women
- Incumbent
- Assumed office 5 November 2024
- Preceded by: Maya Morsy

Amal Mahmoud Atta Ammar (Egyptian Arabic: أمل عمار) is an Egyptian judge. She is President of the National Council for Women since 2024, and previously served as presiding judge of the Qena Court of Appeal and assistant minister of justice for human rights, women, and children's affairs. She was one of the first women appointed judges.

== Career ==
She graduated with a law degree in 1992 and subsequently obtained a master's degree in international commercial law.

She has worked at the Administrative Prosecution Service and the Ministry of Justice, specialising in conflict resolution and child protection, and was appointed president of the Court of First Instance for South Cairo. She was one of the first women appointed judges.

In 2016, Ammar joined the National Council for Women, where she served as deputy rapporteur of the Legislative Committee. On 7 August 2018, she was promoted to president of the Qena Court of Appeal by the Supreme Council of the Judiciary, and in 2019 Ammar became the first female elected deputy chair of the African Union's Advisory Board Against Corruption. She was elected to the Board Against Corruption in 2018 and was re-elected in 2019.

President Abdel Fattah el-Sisi appointed her as President of the National Council for Women during a restructuring of the body on 5 November 2024 to succeed Maya Morsy. At that time, Ammar was also serving as Assistant Minister of Justice for Human Rights, Women and Children.

Forbes ranked her 16th in the list of 20 top women in government in the Middle East.
