= Nevine el-Kabbaj =

Egyptian politician

- نيفين القباج
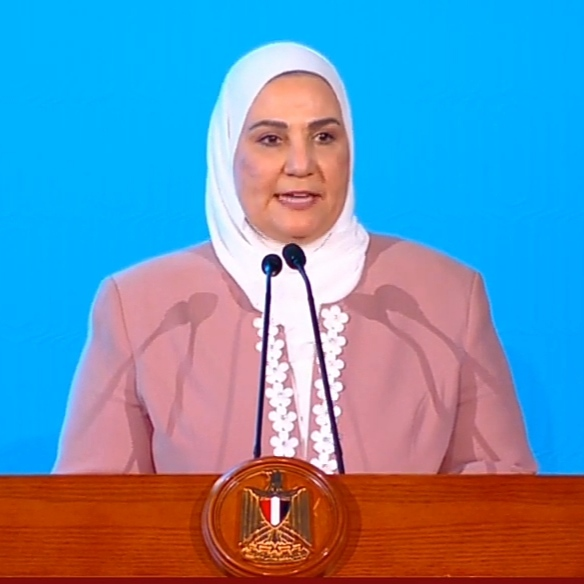

Minister of Social Solidarity
- In office 13 December 2019 – 3 July 2024
- President: Abdel Fattah el-Sisi
- Prime Minister: Mostafa Madbouly
- Preceded by: Ghada Waly
- Succeeded by: Maya Morsy

Personal details
- Born: Nivine Riad El-Kabbag Arabic: نيفين رياض القباج; 10 November 1965 (age 60) Egypt
- Education: Cairo University

Nivine El-Kabbag (Arabic: نيفين القباج; born 10 November 1965) is an Egyptian politician. She served as Minister of Social Solidarity between 2019 and 2024.

Before being appointed, El-Kabbag had served as an assistant solidarity minister for social protection and then a deputy solidarity.
