= National Council for Women =

The National Council for Women in Egypt (NCW) is an Egyptian National Council. The Council was established by Presidential Decree No. 90 of 2000. It is affiliated with the President of the Republic of Egypt. In 2018, Law No. 30/2018 was passed to institutionalize the work of the National Council for Women. The law was drafted to go in line with Articles 11 and 53 of the constitution, which state that men and women are equal in terms of civilian, political, economic, social, and cultural rights; that citizens are equal before the law regardless of religion, gender, color, and language; and that the state will take all measures necessary to eliminate all forms of discrimination in society.

== Composition of the board ==
The Council consists of thirty members from the public figures and those with experience in women's affairs and social activity. The membership term is a renewable four years period. The President of the Republic decides the composition of the Council and the council members used to elect one of them to be the President. According to the law no.30/2018, The President of the council shall be appointed by the President of the Republic.

The Council was last reconstituted on 19/1/2016 by Presidential Decree No. 19 of 2016. On February 1, 2016, the procedural meeting was held at the Council of Ministers headed by Prime Minister Sherif Ismail, in the presence of the members of the Council. The session witnessed the election of Maya Morsy as the President of NCW.

== Presidents ==
- Suzanne Mubarak (2000–2011)
- Mervat Tallawy (2012–2015)
- Maya Morsy (2016–2024)
- Amal Ammar (2024–)

== Mandate and role ==
The council is responsible for ensuring that Egyptian women are treated on equal footing with men in terms of political, economic, social and cultural rights. Its mandate is to plan for the advancement of women, Draft a national plan for the advancement of women and solve their problems, Advising on draft laws and decisions pertinent to women prior to their submission to the competent authority, and recommending draft laws and decisions needed for the advancement of women, Advising on all agreements relating to women, Representing women in international forums and organizations concerned with women's issues, Coordinate, network and provide technical support, Advocate for change, awareness raising and mobilization of the community reviewing, and propose policies and legislation, follow up on the plans' implementation, propose policies for women's development and empowerment, enable women to play their essential role in society, integrate their efforts into national comprehensive development programs. The council shall also ill seek to reinforce women's rights in line with the constitution and international conventions signed by Egypt.

== Structure and mechanisms ==
The Council is consisting of a technical secretariat that is based in Cairo. It has specialized committees such as: Education, youth, political participation, Civil society, culture, external affairs, health, governorates, legislative, training, rural women, disabilities, economic, scientific research, media, environment and Families of martyrs. It also has 27 branches all over Egypt's Governorates. The council has a women's complaints office that receives complaints and give legislative consultations. Also there is a women's business development center that give training to women to enhance their business skills.

The Council has also a Civil Society forum linked to it which is the platform of consulting with Civil society on matters related to gender and women affairs.

== The National Strategy of Egyptian Women Empowerment 2030 ==
In the year 2017, as has been declared by Egypt's President to be women's year; Egypt is the first country globally to launch its national women strategy 2030 aligned with the SDGs as has been stated by the UN.

"The United Nations commends the launch of Egypt's Women's Strategy 2030 under the leadership of the National Council for Women – a pioneer strategy globally for women's empowerment – and welcomes the presidential directions to the Government of Egypt to regard the Egyptian Women's Strategy 2030 as the reference document that guides the upcoming work on the Sustainable Development Goals (SDGs)"

This confirms the country's commitment to achieve the empowerment of Egyptian women and its will to play an active role in the advancement of women. The National Strategy for the Empowerment of Egyptian Women 2030 was adopted by the President of Egypt in 2017. Directive to the Government of Egypt to adopt all its contents and consider it as a guide and a roadmap for all the work concerning the empowerment of women.

The Strategy has 34 SDG's indicators and comprises four main pillars:

- Political empowerment and leadership
- Economic empowerment
- Social empowerment
- Protection

Legislation and culture are cross cutting pillars.

To ensure rigorous monitoring for the strategy, Egypt National Observatory for Women established ENOW that follows up on its implementation of the targets of the status of women in the period from 2017 to 2030 through monitoring and evaluation including the establishment of baselines and follow up indicators to measure and track progress.
