= Ministry of Social Solidarity =

Government ministry of Egypt

Arab Republic of Egypt Ministry of Social Solidarity
- وزارة التضامن الاجتماعي
- Emblem of Egypt

Agency overview
- Jurisdiction: Government of Egypt
- Headquarters: Giza
- Agency executive: Nevine el-Kabbaj, Minister
- Website: http://www.moss.gov.eg/ar-eg/Pages/default.aspx

The Ministry of Social Solidarity is the government body responsible for providing social safety networks for Egypt's most vulnerable citizens. Dr. Maya Morsy currently serves as Egypt's Minister of Social Solidarity, succeeding Nivine El-Qabbage. Its vision is to reduce the number of poor in the country by providing support and social safety nets.

== Duties ==
NGOs and charities work hand in hand with the Ministry and do a large part of the social safety net work, however, after the June 2013 Egyptian protests and when Abdel Fattah el-Sisi became president, he stated NGOs had to be carefully vetted for national security reasons. Egypt was widely criticized for this.

In August 2013, the ministry began disbanding The Muslim Brotherhood. In 2014, the ministry reported there were 600 NGOs operating in Egypt. The ministry required NGOs to show transparency and reveal where their funding came from. In 2016, the NGOs Act was passed and the ministry sent letters to NGOs requiring them to disclose activities a month and a half prior to said activities. The NGOs Act passed in 2016 allowed the Ministry of Social Solidarity to disband NGOs but in June 2018, the Egyptian Supreme Constitutional Court stated that clause in the Act was unconstitutional and that the ministry did not have the right to disband NGOs.

== Initiatives ==
The ministry has developed a welfare system, to provide cash and support services to people in need, such as to orphans under 18, children of single mothers, previously imprisoned people, disabled citizens, elderly over 65, divorced women and widows.

In 2015, the ministry began its You Are Stronger Than Drugs campaign featuring football star Mohamed Salah. Again in 2018, the ministry in conjunction with the Ministry of Youth and Sports, launched an anti-addiction advertising campaign featuring Mohamed Salah, to encourage its young citizens to avoid illegal drug use.

Egypt's population explosion is being addressed by the ministry and the United Nations Population Fund (UNFPA) with a campaign begun in 2018 called two is enough to promote the use of birth control. The campaign is set to continue until 2030.

== See also ==
- Cabinet of Egypt
