= City University of Seattle =

Private university in Seattle, Washington, US

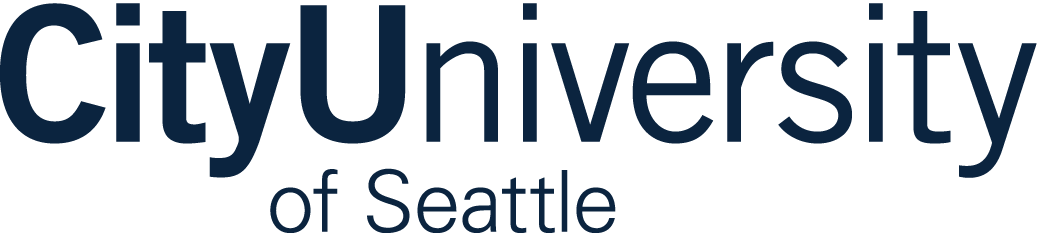
- Former names: City College (1973–1982)
- Motto: We're Here to Get You There.
- Type: Private university
- Established: 1973; 53 years ago
- Accreditation: NWCCU
- Affiliations: National University System
- Academic affiliations: CONAHEC
- Endowment: US$20.9 million
- President: Suzanne Walsh
- Provost: Melissa Mecham
- Faculty: 900+
- Students: 6,755
- Undergraduates: 2,638
- Postgraduates: 2,518
- Doctoral students: 300
- Location: Seattle, Washington, United States; 47.6175°N 122.3444°W
- Campus: 1.15 acres (0.47 hectares; 50,000 square feet; 4,700 square metres); Urban
- Colors: Teal and Marine
- Website: cityu.edu

City University of Seattle (CityU) is a private nonprofit university headquartered in Seattle, Washington, United States. Founded in 1973, the university serves undergraduate, graduate and doctoral students through online, on-campus and mixed-mode programs. CityU primarily serves working adults and transfer students and offers academic programs in business and management, technology and computing, education and leadership, and health and social sciences. The university also operates programs and educational partnerships internationally.

== History ==
The college first opened in rented office space in the Lyon Building in downtown Seattle.

Over the years, the school has expanded its locations worldwide and negotiated partnerships with other educational institutions to offer certificate and degree programs. As of 2014, City University of Seattle has graduated more than 50,000 students worldwide.

== Academics & Accredidation ==
City University of Seattle offers undergraduate, graduate, doctoral and certificate programs. The university operates on the quarter system and offers programs through online, on-campus and mixed-mode formats.

CityU's academic model emphasizes applied learning and instruction by practitioner faculty, with curricula designed to connect academic theory with professional practice.

Academic areas include:

School of Business and Management

School of Education and Leadership

School of Health and Social Sciences

School of Technology and Computing

- CityU's School of Technology and Computing is designated a National Center of Academic Excellence in Cyber Defense Education by the National Security Agency and Department of Homeland Security.

Educational Model: CityU has historically focused on serving working adults and other students seeking flexible pathways to a degree. Its academic model emphasizes applied learning, career relevance and instruction by practitioner faculty.

Since 1978, City University of Seattle has been accredited by the Northwest Commission on Colleges and Universities.

CityU's Project Management degree programs are accredited by the Project Management Institute.

The School of Management is accredited by the Accreditation Council for Business Schools and Programs (ACBSP).

== Locations and International Programs ==
The headquarters of the university is in a building located in downtown Seattle. City University also has additional Washington campuses in Vancouver, Renton and Tacoma. The university through international university partnerships offers academic programs in Canada, China, the Czech Republic, Mexico, Slovakia, and Vietnam.

== Notable alumni and faculty ==
- Calvin Ayre – Canadian billionaire and founder of Bodog Entertainment Group and the Calvin Ayre Foundation
- Donald P. Dunbar – former Adjutant General of the Wisconsin Air National Guard
- Mohamed Fahmy – Canadian-Egyptian journalist with CNN and Al Jazeera English
- Bruce Harrell – former mayor of Seattle, the city's first Asian-American and second African-American mayor, and former city council president
- Maya Morsy – Minister of Social Solidarity of Egypt and former president of the National Council for Women
- Scott Reske – former member of the Indiana House of Representatives
