= Chromat =

American fashion label

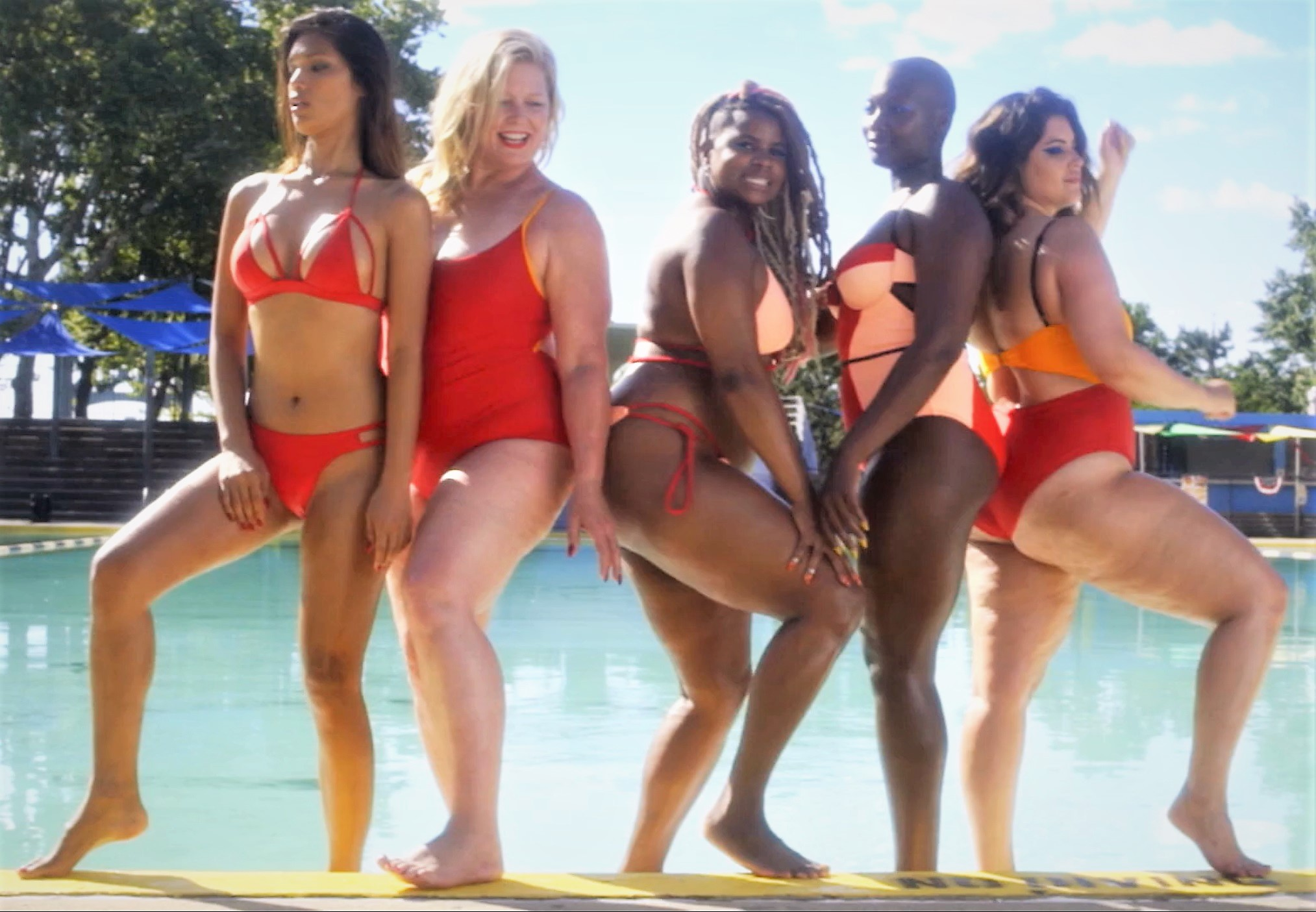
- (Left to right): Unconventional fashion models Geena Rocero, Emme, Ericka Hart, Mama Cax, and Denise Bidot advertise for Chromat in 2018
- Industry: Fashion
- Founded: New York City, New York, U.S. (2010)
- Founder: Becca McCharen-Tran
- Headquarters: New York City, U.S.
- Products: Womenswear, apparel, swimwear, lingerie, activewear, footwear
- Website: Official website

Chromat is an American fashion label based in New York City. The label was formed by Becca McCharen-Tran in 2010. Drawing from Becca McCharen-Tran's background in architecture and urban design, Chromat focuses on empowering garments for all bodies. In early 2025, McCharen-Tran shared that the spring 2025 collection would be Chromat's last collection for the foreseeable future.

== About ==
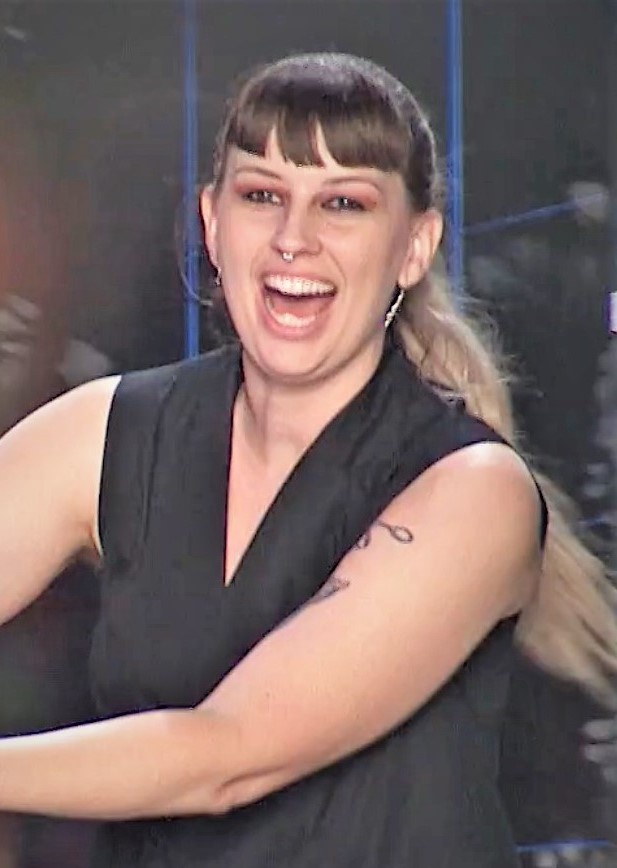
McCharen presenting the Spring-Summer 2018 Serenity Collection at New York Fashion Week

Chromat began in 2010 as an extension of McCharen-Tran's degree in architecture design at University of Virginia School of Architecture. It was originally a collaboration with fellow architecture student Emily Kappes. Chromat's structural language is the foundation of each garment: from the simplest bikini to the most complex 3D printed dress. Chromat swimwear, lingerie, and signature architectural cages are all designed in New York City.

Chromat has designed custom pieces for Beyoncé's Mrs. Carter Show World Tour, Super Bowl XLVII halftime show (2013), and performance at the 2014 MTV VMAs. Chromat garments have also been worn by Madonna on her 2012 MDNA World Tour, and in her "Girl Gone Wild" music video; by Nicki Minaj in her 2011 Femme Fatale Tour and Powerhouse 2014 performances; and by Iggy Azalea and Rita Ora's backup dancers at their 2014 Wireless Festival performance of "Black Widow." Chromat clothing and accessories appear in music videos including "Seekir" by Zola Jesus; "Wet" by Nicole Scherzinger; "King of Hearts" by Cassie; "Tear The House Up" by Hervé; and "Cool for the Summer" by Demi Lovato.

Celebrities who have been styled in Chromat clothing include FKA Twigs, Teyana Taylor, Amandla Stenberg, Tyra Banks, Zendaya, Taylor Swift, Gigi Hadid, Joseph Culp, Ellie Goulding, Ronda Rousey, Azealia Banks, Grimes, Hayley Williams, Ariana Grande, Sky Ferreira, Natalia Kills, Charli XCX, Kelly Rowland, Kanye West, and 50 Cent. Chromat has collaborated with Intel, Reebok, Misfit, and MAC Cosmetics.

Chromat's New York Fashion week collections include: Superstructures (Autumn/Winter 2013), Mathletes (Spring/Summer 2014), Bionic Bodies (Autumn/Winter 2014), Formula 15 (Spring/Summer 2015), Mindfiles (Autumn/Winter 2015), Momentum (Spring/Summer 2016), Lumina (Autumn/Winter 2016), Hyperwave (Spring/Summer 2017), Buoyancy (Autumn/Winter 2017), Serenity (Spring/Summer 2018), and Wavvy (Autumn/Winter 2018).

Chromat has been featured in magazine editorials and features, including Vogue Italia, Vogue Deutsch, Galore, V, Elle, Nylon, Vogue, Dazed, New York Magazine and Numéro. McCharen has been profiled by The New York Observer (2012), The Wall Street Journal (2013), and Out Magazine (2013), and was on the Forbes 30 Under 30 list of "People Who are Reinventing the World" in 2014. She was nominated for the RACKED Young Guns Award in 2013, was a finalist in the CFDA/Vogue Fashion Fund 2015, and was runner-up in the same contest in 2017. Chromat was awarded the Tumblr Fashion Honors in 2016.
