= Downtown Emergency Service Center =

Non-profit organization in Seattle, Washington, U.S.

- Purpose: Homelessness
- Headquarters: Seattle, Washington, U.S.
- Website: www.desc.org

The Downtown Emergency Service Center (DESC) is a non-profit organization in Seattle, Washington, United States, providing services for that city's homeless population. The organization was founded in 1979 to aid those living in a state of chronic homelessness who, due to their severe and persistent mental and addictive illnesses, were not being served by the existing shelters at the time. At its opening, the non-profit sheltered nearly 200 adults in the ballroom of the Morrison Hotel. DESC clients engage with mental health services, case management and employment services at DESC projects. DESC currently operates 5 shelters and 15 supportive housing projects and is largely funded by the City of Seattle and King County. It does not conduct background checks on people coming through its services.

== History ==
In the late 1970s, concerns were raised to Seattle's mayor that there were increases in homelessness and that the mentally ill were not getting the services they needed. Because of these concerns, the City of Seattle, the Church Council of Seattle and WAMI (Washington Advocates for the Mentally Ill) partnered to open the center in 1979.

== Innovation ==
=== 1811 Eastlake project ===
DESC designed and developed the 1811 Eastlake project to house up to 75 formerly homeless alcoholics. Residents in this housing project are permitted to possess and consume alcohol in their rooms and are not required to enroll in treatment as a condition of their housing. These terms were initially controversial as critics voiced anger that residents did not have to stay sober.

A study by the University of Washington showed a 35 percent reduction in heavy drinking among 1811 residents and a substantially reduced frequency of delirium tremens. A 2006 study by the University of Washington found that 1811 Eastlake improved residents' lives and saved Seattle more than $2 million each year.

== See also ==
- Housing First
- Homelessness in the United States
