= Drag Latina =

Latin American television series

- Genre: Reality competition
- Directed by: Xavi Marti
- Presented by: Ninel Conde
- Judges: Ninel Conde; Fedro; Connie Peña; Nicki Lauren
- Opening theme: "Drag Latina" theme
- Original languages: Spanish; English
- No. of episodes: 8

Production
- Producers: Chiru Adams; Xavi Marti
- Production locations: Dallas, Texas
- Camera setup: Multiple
- Production company: Cromática Forever Pictures

Original release
- Network: Revry
- Release: 16 October – 22 November 2022

Drag Latina is a Latin American reality competition television series. The series premiered on 16 October 2022 and is broadcast through Revry.

In December 2021, Ninel Conde was confirmed to host the reality competition series. In September 2022, the competition series was revealed from Revry. The cast was officially revealed through social media in September 2022, which is a total of ten contestants competing the title of "Drag Latina". With the announcement of the series, it was confirmed that Fedro will be judging.

== Contestants ==
Contestants of Drag Latina
Contestant	Outcome
Vicky Chavarria	Winner
Amalara Sofia	Runner-up
Valeria Sparks	3rd place
Anika Leclere	3rd place
Leyla Edwards	5th place
Afrika Mendiola	5th place
Mariah Spanic	7th place
Sunel Molina	8th place
Venus Carangi	9th place
Chichi Fuera	10th place

== Contestant progress ==
Contestant	Episode							
Contestant	1	2	3	4	5	6	7	8
Vicky Chavarria	SAFE	SAFE	BTM	WIN	SAFE	SAFE	WIN	Winner
Amalara Sofia	SAFE	WIN	SAFE	SAFE	WIN	WIN	BTM	Runner-up
Valeria Sparks	WIN	SAFE	SAFE	SAFE	BTM	BTM	SAFE	Eliminated
Anika Leclere	BTM	SAFE	SAFE	SAFE	SAFE	SAFE	SAFE	Eliminated
Leyla Edwards	SAFE	SAFE	WIN	SAFE	WIN	SAFE	ELIM	
Afrika Mendiola	SAFE	SAFE	SAFE	SAFE	SAFE	BTM	ELIM	
Mariah Spanic	SAFE	SAFE	SAFE	BTM	ELIM			
Sunel Molina	SAFE	SAFE	SAFE	ELIM				
Venus Carangi	SAFE	BTM	ELIM					
Chichi Fuera	BTM	ELIM						

Legend:

Vicky Chavarria won Drag Latina.
Amalara Sofia was the runner-up.
WIN indicates that the contestant won the runway theme in that episode.
SAFE indicates that the judges declared the contestant safe in that episode.
BTM (Bottom) indicates that the contestant received one of the lowest scores of the episode.
ELIM (Eliminated) indicates that the contestant was eliminated in that episode.

== Lip syncs ==
Episode	Contestant					Song	Eliminated
1	Anika Leclere		vs.	Chichi Fuera		"Quitame ese Hombre""; Pilar Montenegro	None
2	Chichi Fuera		vs.	Venus Carangi		"Con los Ojos Cerrados"; Gloria Trevi	Chichi Fuera
3	Venus Carangi		vs.	Vicky Chavarria		"Mujer Latina"; Thalía	Venus Carangi
4	Sunel Molina		vs.	Mariah Spanic		"Como La Flor"; Selena Quintanilla	Sunel Molina
5	Mariah Spanic		vs.	Valeria Sparks		"Es mentiroso" Olga Tañón	Mariah Spanic
6	Afrika Mendiola		vs.	Valeria Sparks		"Las campanas del amor" Mónica Naranjo	None
7	Afrika Mendiola	vs.	Leyla Edwards	vs.	Amalara Sofía	"La gata bajo la lluvia" Rocío Dúrcal	Afrika Mendiola
7	Afrika Mendiola	vs.	Leyla Edwards	vs.	Amalara Sofía	"La gata bajo la lluvia" Rocío Dúrcal	Leyla Edwards

Legend:

The contestant was eliminated after their first time in the bottom.
The contestant was eliminated after their second time in the bottom.

== Episodes ==
No. in season	Title	Original release date
1	"Zodiaco"	16 October 2022
Ten drag queens arrived at the workroom of Drag Latina, where they presented themselves. Their first runway look is a look inspired by the zodiac signs.: Runway Theme: Zodiac Sign; Runway Winner: Valeria Sparx; Bottom Two: Anika Leclere and Chichi Fuera; Lip Sync Song: "Quitame ese Hombre" by Pilar Montenegro; Eliminated: Chichi Fuera
