= Henri Berény =

Hungarian composer (1871–1932)

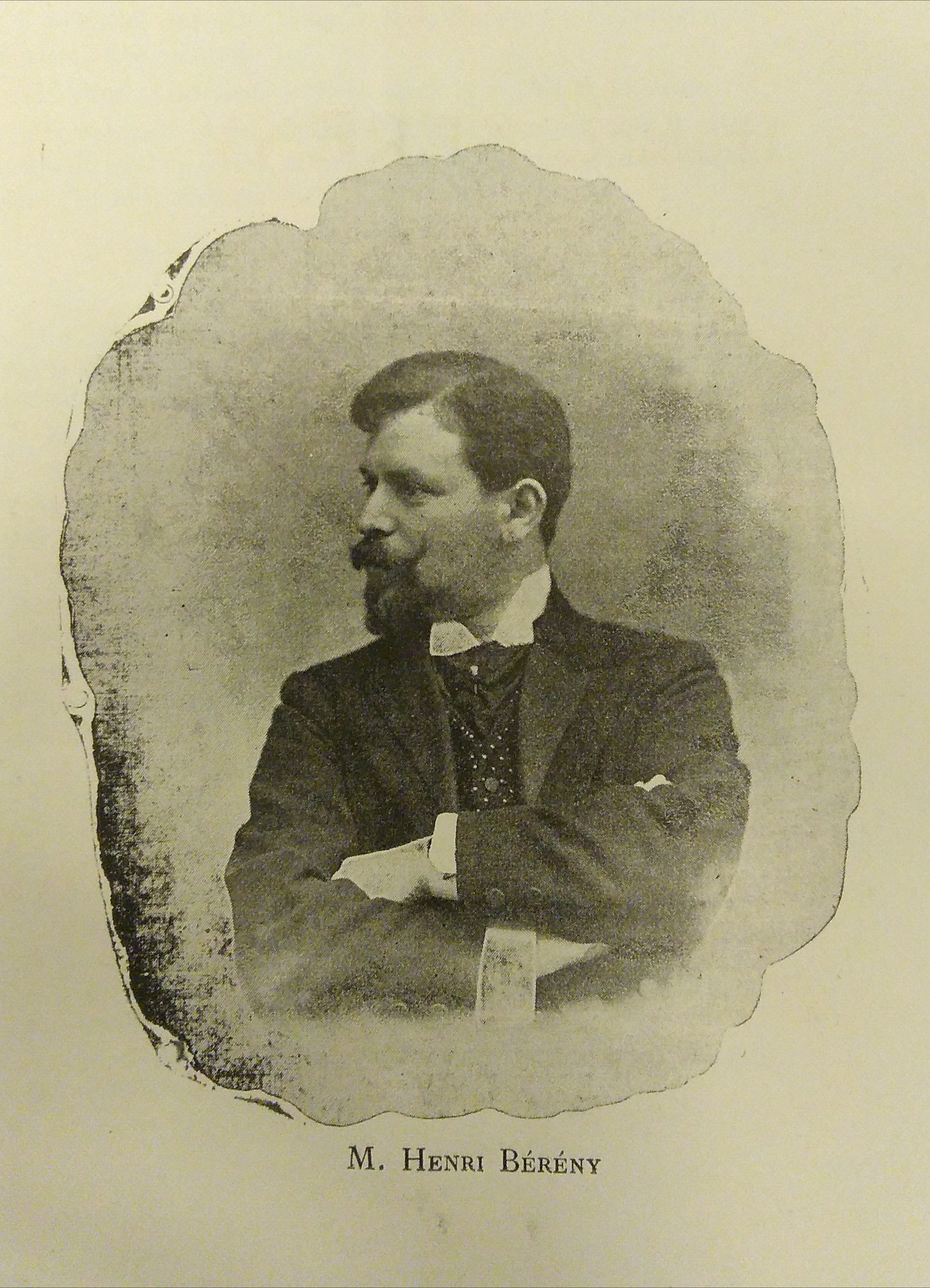
Portrait of Henri Berény (1900)

Henri Weiss, better known as Henri Berény and also given as Henrik Berény and Henry Bereny (1 January 1871 – 23 March 1932) was a Hungarian composer, violinist, pianist, conductor, screenwriter and film director. He is best remembered as a composer of operas and operettas. The brother of composer and pianist Josef Weiss, his best known works are Lord Piccolo (also known as Little Boy Blue) and Das Mädel von Montmartre (English: The Girl from Montmartre), both of which were staged on Broadway and at theaters internationally.

In addition to his work for the theatre, Berény wrote more than 300 popular dance works, and composed numerous songs in both classical and popular styles. He also published several ragtime piano works that were written in the style of Scott Joplin, and had a brief career as a film director and screenwriter for silent films that began with the 1907 short film The Hand. He notably directed his wife, the Danish actress Charlotte Wiehe-Berény, in the 1916 Danish film Lotte vil paa Landet.

== Life and career ==
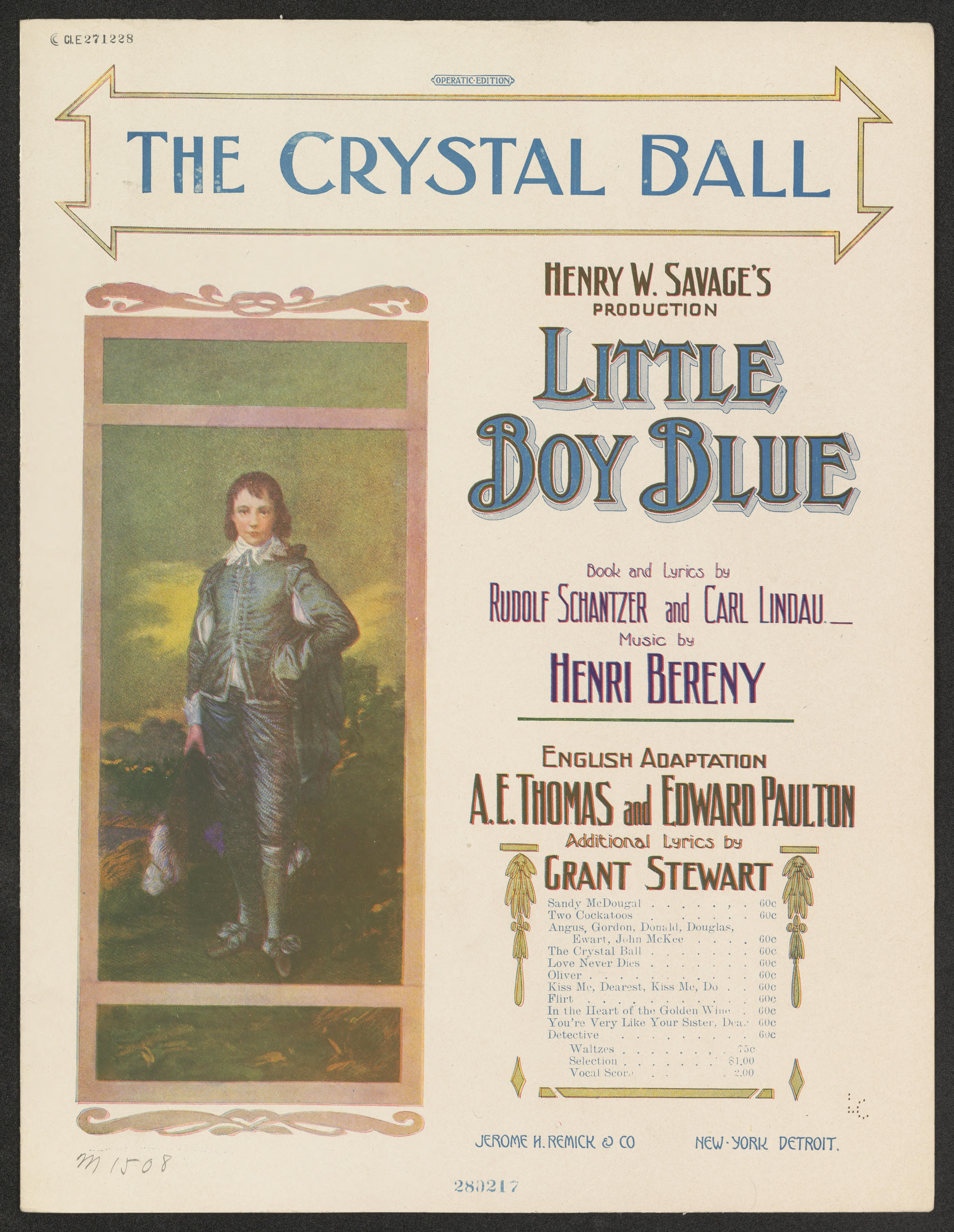
Front cover of sheet music for Henri Berény's song "The Crystal Ball" from Little Boy Blue, published by Jerome H. Remick & Co. in 1911

Born in Kassa (now Košice), Henri Berény's birth name was Henri Weiss. He was the son of Hungarian Jewish parents Emil and Charlotte Weiss. His older brother Josef Weiss was also a composer and pianist of note. He legally changed his surname to Perényi on 17 November 1899, and then altered it legally once again to Berény on 1 December 1899. Both Henri and his brother were pupils of Franz Liszt at the Budapest Conservatory in their youth.

As a young adult, Berény studied violin with Joseph Joachim at the Vienna Conservatory (now the University of Music and Performing Arts Vienna). His first published compositions were art songs published in Berlin in 1893. His opera Der erste Carneval was premiered at the Hamburg State Opera in March 1898. He married the Danish actress and ballet dancer Charlotte Wiehe-Berény in Copenhagen on 7 December 1899, after which the couple resided in Paris. Der erste Carneval was staged in French at the Théâtre des Capucines in Paris in 1900 with his wife as one of the leading performers.

Berény's most successful operetta, Lord Piccolo, premiered at the Johann Strauss Theater in Vienna, Austria, in the German language on 9 January 1910. It was brought to the United States by opera impresario Henry W. Savage who produced an English language version of the work on Broadway in 1911 that was entitled Little Boy Blue. It starred Gertrude Bryan in the title role, and the work had a lengthy national tour of the United States after its run on Broadway ended. This was followed by another popular success, Berény's 1911 operetta Das Mädel von Montmartre which was staged on Broadway as The Girl from Montmartre in 1912 after a successful premiere in Berlin the year prior. Some of his music from these works was recorded for Columbia Records.

Berény and his wife suffered greatly during World War I. Due to the political climate of the war, Hungarians were banned from living and working in Paris and their home and property were seized by the French government. They were forced to leave the city, and relocated to Denmark where the couple collaborated on the 1916 silent film Lotte vil paa Landet. Berény wrote the screenplay and directed this film, and his wife was one of its stars.

In 1920, Henri and Charlotte divorced, but they later reconciled and married each other a second time on 6 August 1929 at Copenhagen City Hall. Berény was also active as a concert pianist in Europe. In 1921, he gave a concert of his own piano compositions at the Konzerthaus, Vienna. In 1930, he founded the Orchestre Symphonique de Tziganes, an orchestra which he directed that performed in cities in France, Germany, and England in the early 1930s.

Berény died on 23 March 1932 in Budapest at the age of 61.

== Partial list of operas and operettas ==
- Der erste Carneval, opera (premiered in German in 1898, Hamburg State Opera; French language version premiered at Théâtre des Capucines, Paris, 1900)
- Lord Piccolo, operetta (1910, later adapted into English as Little Boy Blue)
- Das Mädel von Montmartre, operetta (premiered Neues Theater Berlin 26 October 1911; later adapted into English as The Girl from Montmartre)
