= William F. Kirk =

Baseball writer, columnist, humorist, poet and songwriter

- Born: William Frederick Kirk; April 29, 1877; Mankato, Minnesota, U.S.
- Died: March 25, 1927 (aged 49); Chippewa Falls, Wisconsin, U.S.
- Occupations: Baseball writer, columnist, humorist, poet, songwriter

William Frederick Kirk (April 29, 1877 – March 25, 1927) was an American baseball writer, columnist, humorist, poet and songwriter.

== Biography ==
Born in Mankato, Minnesota, Kirk spent most of his childhood in Chippewa Falls, Wisconsin. He graduated from high school there and began his career in journalism on a local paper. His humor column, "Fleeting Fancies", was a popular feature in the Chippewa Falls Herald and later in the Milwaukee Sentinel. It brought him to the attention of metropolitan dailies and was the name of his first book, published in 1904. Kirk's lyrics drew comparisons with those of other poets, whose work he sometimes parodied: Henry Wadsworth Longfellow, Eugene Field, and James Whitcomb Riley.

A longtime newspaperman, Kirk got his start at press outlets in Chippewa Falls and Milwaukee. In 1905 he signed a contract with the Hearst organization and moved to New York, where he was employed at two of William Randolph Hearst's papers: the New York American and the New York Evening Journal. After returning to Chippewa Falls in 1918, he continued working as a nationally syndicated columnist.

For eighteen years Kirk was distributed by the International Features Syndicate and reached a national audience as he wrote on subjects as diverse as baseball, temperance, women's suffrage and divorce. His pieces were seen in everything from "The Smart Set" to trade union publications. He was widely known for the features "Little Bobbie's Pa" and "The Manicure Lady".

Recent works on baseball's deadball era have had numerous examples of Kirk's sports writing. One can, for instance, read his account of Fred Merkle's infamous blunder or his rhyming tribute to the Flying Dutchman, Honus Wagner. The Unforgettable Season by Gordon H. Fleming recounts the 1908 National League pennant race through contemporary press coverage by Kirk and others. In 1911 Kirk published a collection of baseball ballads called Right Off The Bat.

In 1918 Kirk moved back to Chippewa Falls, desiring to live among old friends and familiar surroundings. He belonged to several fraternal organizations and was a prominent figure in the town.

Failing health caused his early retirement, and after an illness of many months he died of cancer in 1927.

== The Norsk Nightingale ==
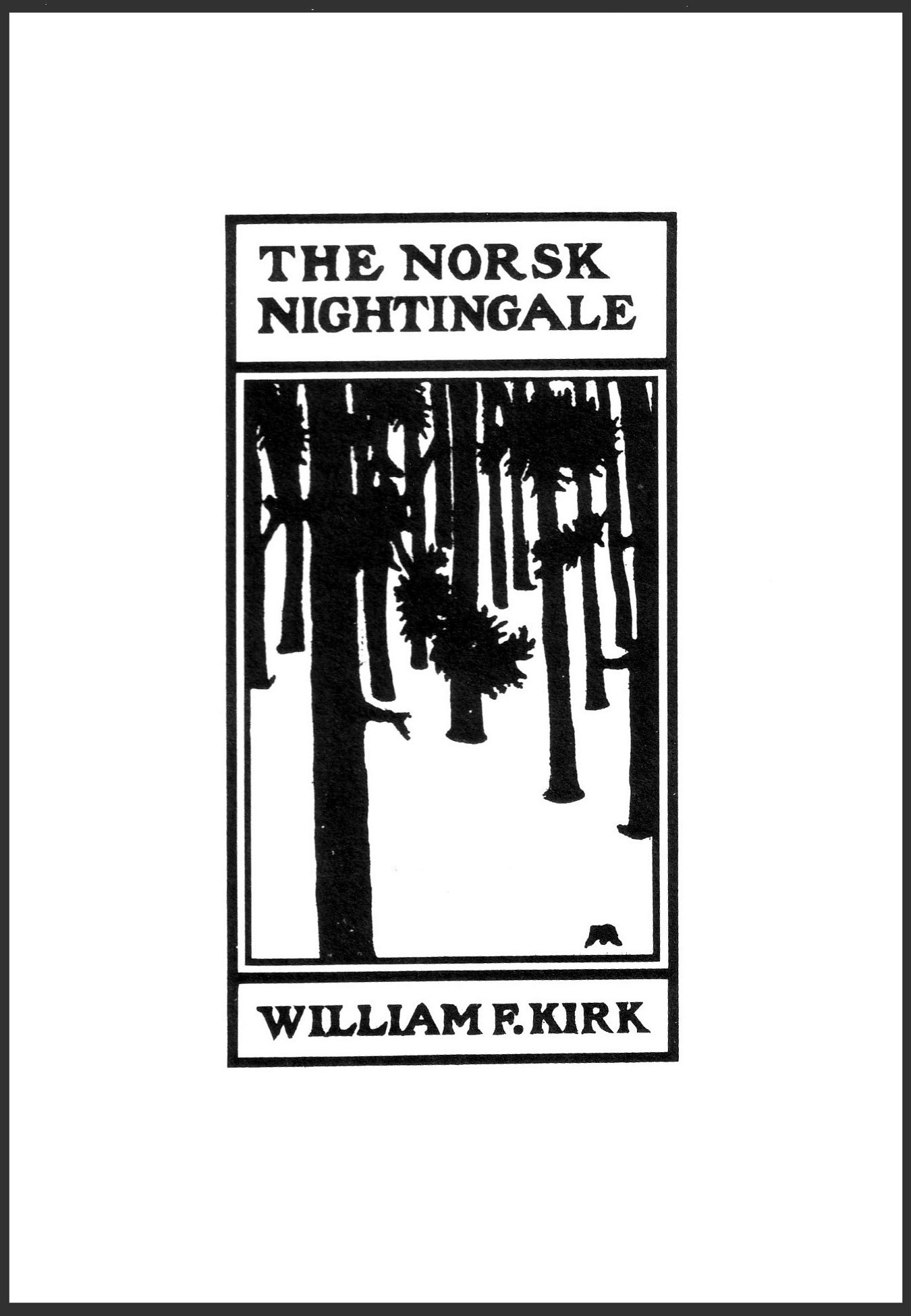
The Norsk Nightingale 1905

William F. Kirk is especially remembered for his Scandinavian dialect poetry, written for a daily column and later published in book form. His byline, "The Norsk Nightingale", was a familiar sight in newspapers across the country. His first collection of dialect verse, The Norsk Nightingale, presented a Norwegian lumberjack from the Upper Midwest. It was his most popular book with sixteen editions printed over a period of thirty-five years. At the time of its publication one reviewer wrote: "Novelty and freshness, and no little ingenuity as a parodist, salute us in this volume of dialect verse hailing from the haunts of the lumberjack or, more locally, northern Wisconsin and Minnesota, where dwell so many neo-Americans of Scandinavian birth."

His second volume of dialect verse, Songs of Sergeant Swanson, reflected the experiences of a Swedish doughboy in World War I. A book of more limited appeal, it only had one edition.

== Scandinavian dialect humor ==
Kirk's ethnic poetry put forth the notion that Scandinavian Americans were good-natured but a little slow. This humorous stereotype had been employed in the 1890s by the playwright Gus Heege in such theatrical works as "Ole Olson" and "Yon Yonson".

Scandinavian dialect humor took other forms: vaudeville sketches, joke books, movies, records and sheet music. In quick succession, Tin Pan Alley published "Hello Wisconsin", "Holy Yumpin Yiminy" and "Scandinavia" (Sing Dose Song And Make Dose Music). The popular recording artists Eleonora and Ethel Olson were known for their warm depictions of immigrant life in stories such as "The Old Sogning Woman" and "A Norwegian Woman Using the Telephone".

El Brendel, Yogi Yorgesson, Stan Boreson and many others have followed in Kirk's footsteps, continuing the tradition of stories about lumberjacks and sergeants, particularly among Scandinavian Amerians.

== Works ==
=== Books ===
- Fleeting Fancies 1904
- The Norsk Nightingale 1905
- Right Off The Bat 1911
- Songs Of Sergeant Swanson 1918
- Out Of The Current 1923
- The Harp Of Fate 1925

=== Stage works ===
- Little Boy Blue 1912, contributing lyricist

=== Songs ===
- "Steve" - William F. Kirk and Harry von Tilzer (1910)
- "I'm Going Down to Beat My Wife" - William F. Kirk and Harry von Tilzer (c. 1910)
- "Flirt" - lyrics by Edward Madden and William F. Kirk, music by Henri Bereny (1911)
- "Little White Rose of Mine" - William F. Kirk and Robert Matthews (1911)
- "Consolation" - William F. Kirk and Gustave Ferrari (1917)
- "Flag of My Heart" - William F. Kirk and Gustave Ferrari (1917)
- "The Other Love" - William F. Kirk and Gustave Ferrari (1917)
- "The Rainbow of Love" - William F. Kirk and Gustave Ferrari (1917)
- "The Harbor of Dreams" - William F. Kirk and Gustave Ferrari (1918)
- "A Sunset Song" - William F. Kirk and Gustave Ferrari (1918)
- "Glory Land" - William F. Kirk and Gustave Ferrari (1919)
- "Red Rose of Love, Bloom Again" - William F. Kirk and J. Stanton Gladwin (1920)
- "Speak For Yureself, Yohn" - William F. Kirk and Henry S. Sawyer (1922)

"Flirt" was in the Broadway musical Little Boy Blue.
"Flag Of My Heart" was recorded by Reinald Werrenrath for Victor Records.
"The Rainbow Of Love" was recorded by John McCormack for Victor Records.

== Gallery ==
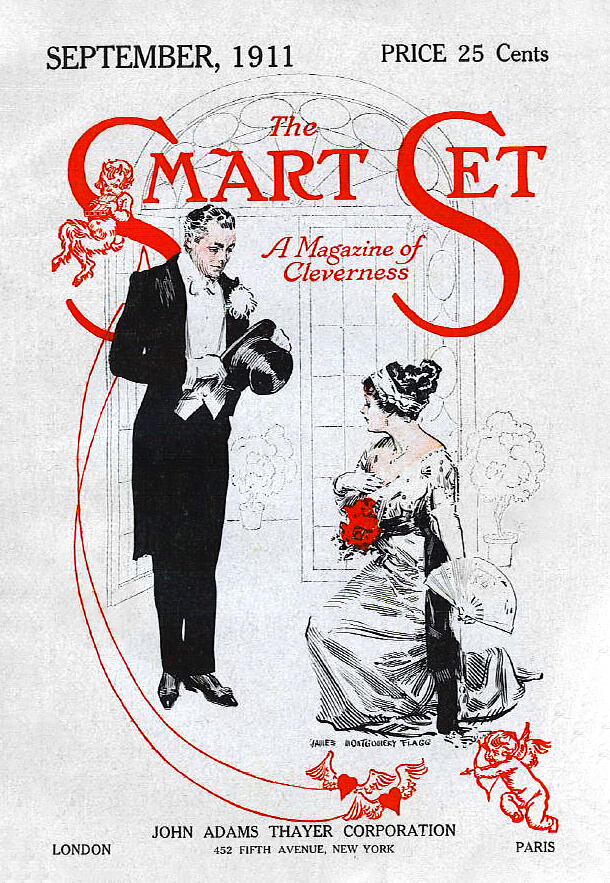
The Smart Set (1911)

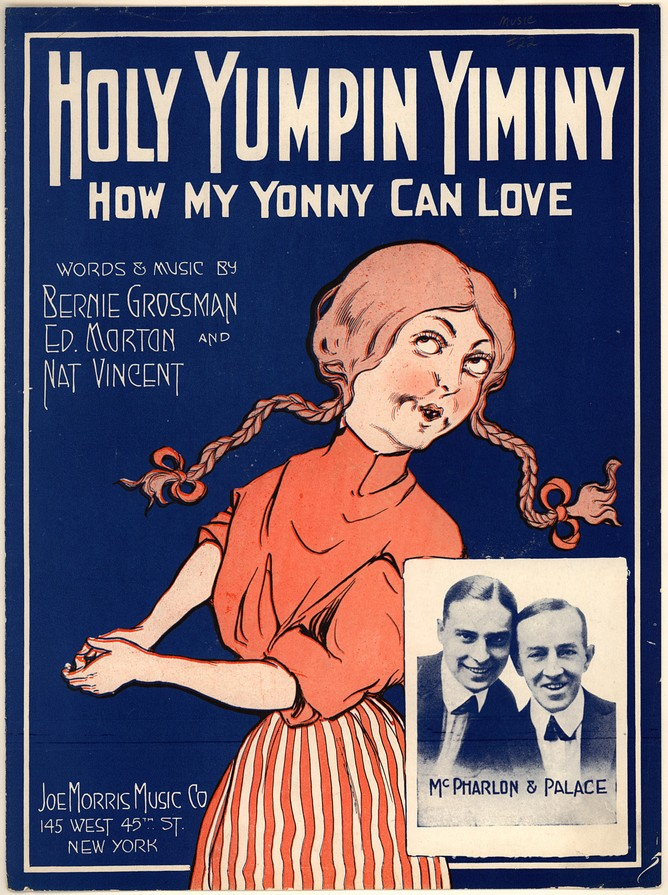
Holy Yumpin Yiminy (1918)
