= Frank Pixley =

Frank Pixley may refer to:

- Frank M. Pixley (1825–1895), American journalist, attorney, and politician
- Frank S. Pixley (1865 or 1867-1919), American playwright, journalist, editor, and author
