= Marcelle (musical) =

Musical by Gustav Luders and Frank Pixley

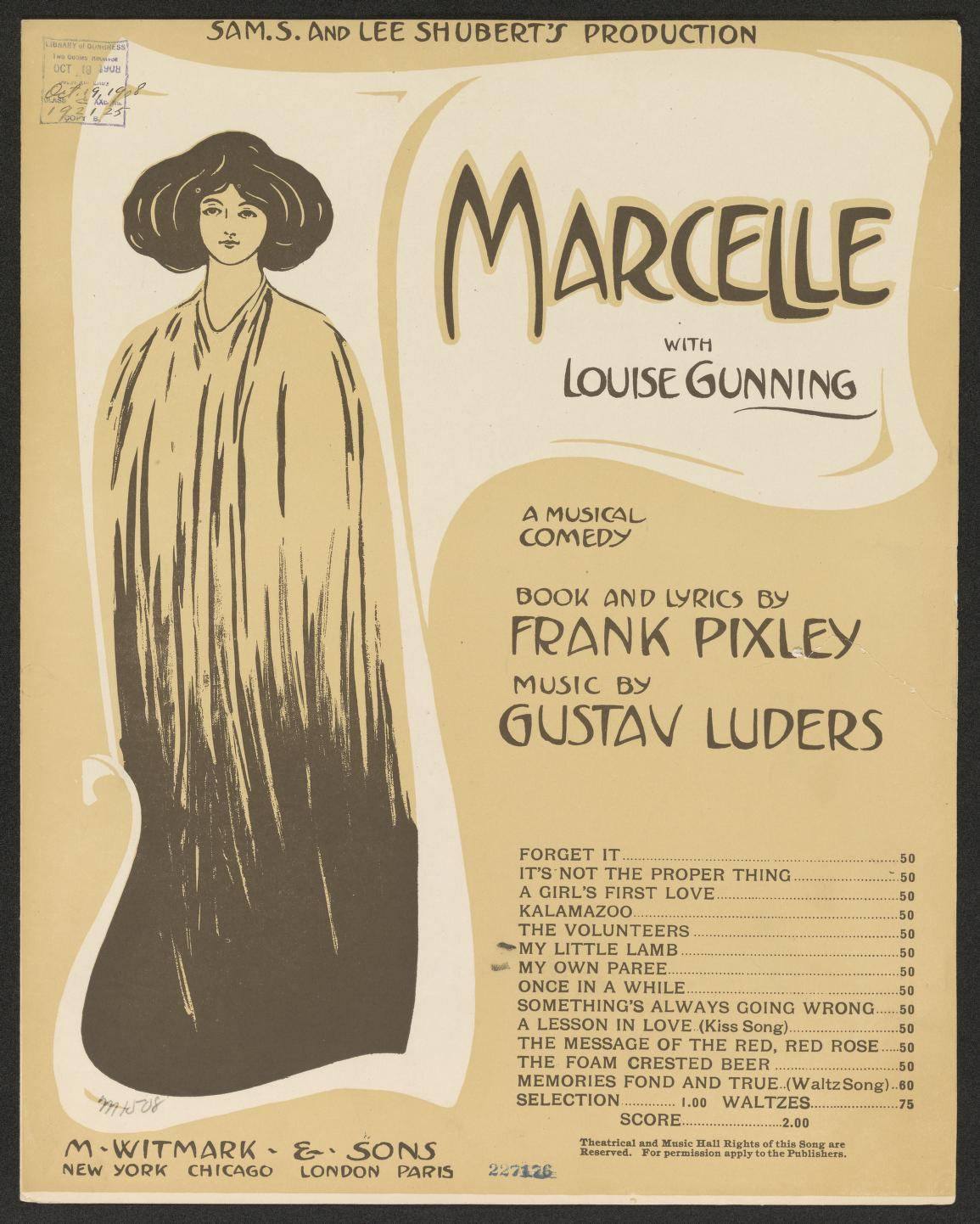
Front cover of sheet music for Marcelle. Published by M. Witmark & Sons in 1908.

Marcelle is a musical in two acts with music by Gustav Luders and both book and lyrics by Frank Pixley. While billed by its creators as a musical, it was in reality more of an operetta. It was created as a starring vehicle for Louise Gunning who portrayed the title role in the original Broadway production. The role of the Parisian barmaid Marcelle required Gunning to masquerade as her character's brother, a young male soldier; making the part a partial trouser role.

== Plot ==
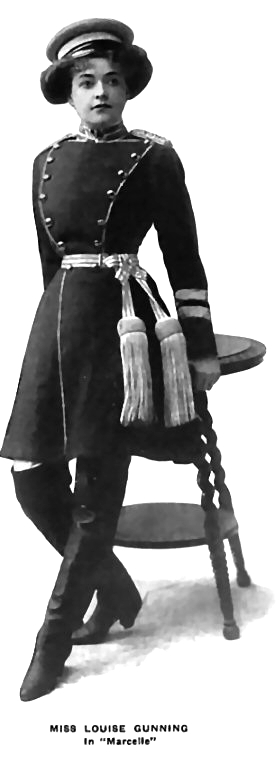
Louise Gunning as Marcelle

Set at Castle Berghof in Germany near the French border, the musical's plot centers around the Baron von Berghof who will lose his castle if he cannot produce a male heir to his estate's executer, the lawyer Klug. If he fails to provide proof of a son his home will be taken from him and given over to his nephew Lieutenant Karl von Berghof.

Childless and afraid of being evicted, Baron von Berghof sends his dimwitted servant Dumm to procure a male actor to masquerade as his long lost son. Rather than finding a suitable boy to pretend to be the baron's son, Dumm returns instead with the French actress Marcelle at the time that he is supposed to present his son to Klug. Marcelle manages to save the Baron by convincing Klug that she is Berghof's daughter and the sister of Baron Berghof's long lost son, a soldier, who will be arriving later.

Marcelle disguises herself as the son and is forced to maintain the charade of being both the daughter and son of the Baron. A comedy of errors ensues as Marcelle and the baron try to keep one step ahead of Klug. Things become more complicated for Marcelle when Lieutenant Karl falls in love with her as the Baron's daughter while having a rivalry with her as the Baron's son. Ultimately, Marcelle's true identity is revealed. The story ends happily with Marcelle marrying Karl von Berghof after he agrees to let the Baron continue to live in his home for the remainder of his life.

== Performance history ==
Marcelle was produced by brothers Lee and Sam S. Shubert and directed by Frank Smithson. It was choreographed by Dave Bennett and used costumes designed by Melville Ellis. The cast included Louise Gunning as Marcelle, Jess Dandy as the Baron von Berghof, Nettie Black as the Baroness von Berghof, Frank Rushworth as Lieutenant Karl von Berghof, Henry Norman as Dumm, Herbert Cawthorne as Herr Schwindle, Lawrence Wheat as Bud Wilson, and George C. Boniface Jr. as the lawyer Klug.

Marcelle premiered on Broadway at the Casino Theatre on October 1, 1908. It ran for a total of 68 performances, closing on November 28, 1908. The New York Times review of the premiere was critical of the book by Pixley stating it "was not distinguished by any brilliant originality." However, that review was highly complimentary of Gustav Luders's score and Louise Gunning's singing. Of Gunning's performance the reviewer wrote "with a beautiful bird note she aroused the house to tremendous enthusiasm, and had to repeat encore after encore."

The show's most successful song was "The Message of the Red, Red Rose" which was very similar to an earlier tune, "The Message of the Violet", from Luders and Pixley's 1903 musical The Prince of Pilsen. Another musical highlight of the production was the song "My Little Lamb" whose performance by Lawrence Wheat as both a singer and dancer was praised widely in the press.

Several theatre historians, including Dan Dietz and Gerald Bordman, have noted a comedic highlight of the production as a scene in Act 2 in which the Baron and the lawyer Klug are both trying to outwit the other by trying to covertly get the other one drunk without their knowledge. They each separately sneak alcohol into the same supposedly non-alcoholic punch bowl in the attempt to get the other drunk, and both are successful at covertly getting rid of their own drink without the other observing in an amusing scene of physical and psychological comedy in which both men are amazed at the other's tolerance to alcohol.
