= The Prince of Pilsen (film) =

1926 film by Paul Powell

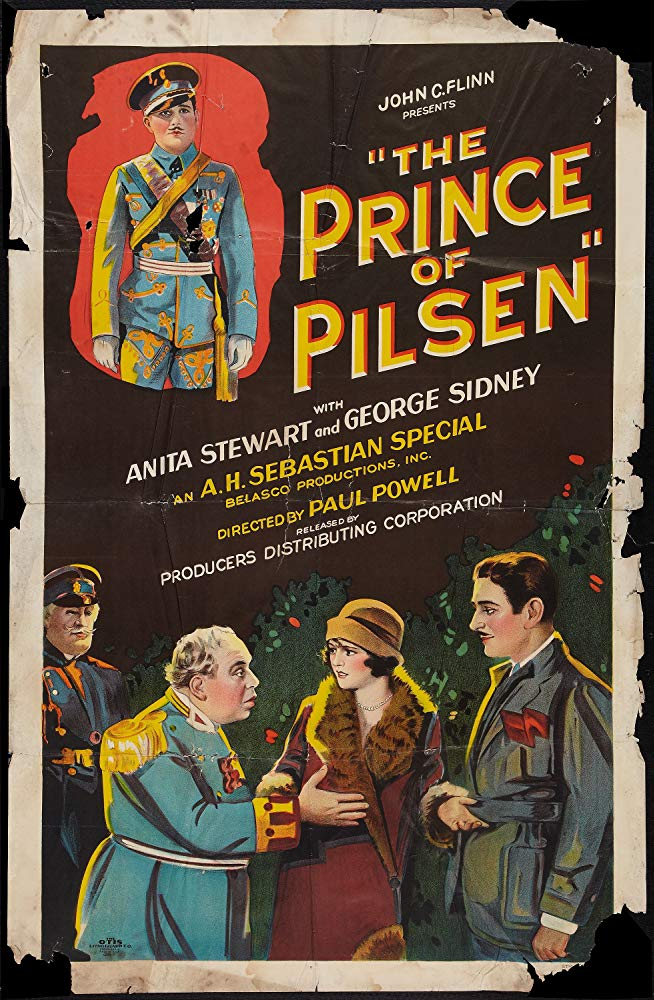
- Film poster
- Directed by: Paul Powell
- Written by: Anthony Coldeway
- Based on: The Prince of Pilsen by Frank S. Pixley and Gustav Luders
- Produced by: David Belasco; John C. Flynn
- Starring: George Sidney; Anita Stewart; Allan Forrest
- Cinematography: James Van Trees
- Distributed by: Producers Distributing Corporation
- Release date: May 2, 1926
- Running time: 70 minutes
- Country: United States
- Language: Silent (English intertitles)

The Prince of Pilsen is a lost 1926 American silent romantic comedy film directed by Paul Powell and starring Anita Stewart and George Sidney. David Belasco produced the film. It was based on a 1903 Broadway musical The Prince of Pilsen by Frank S. Pixley and music by Gustav Luders.

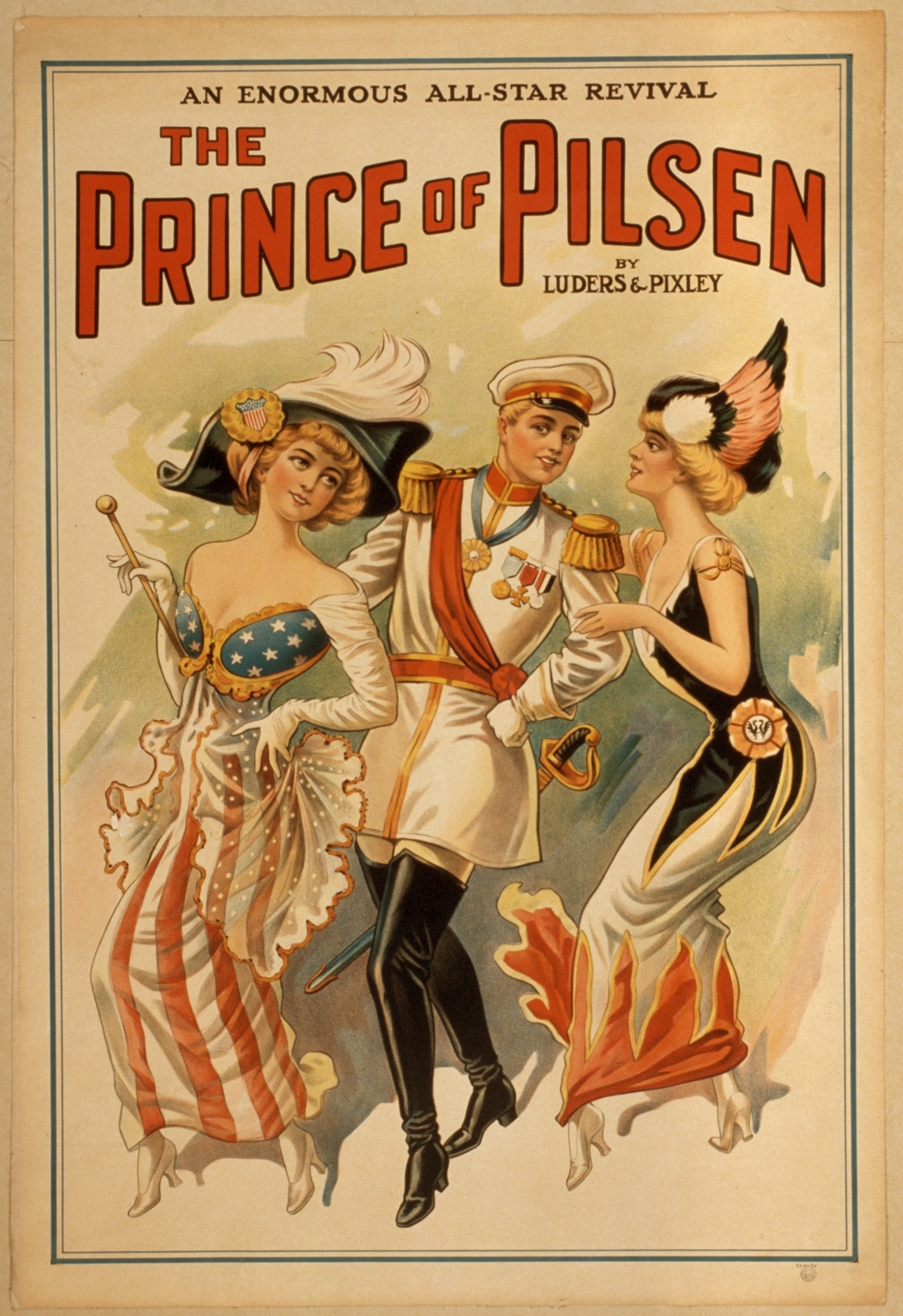
Advertisement for the theatrical show The Prince of Pilsen

The film was parodied by Mack Sennett that same year as The Prince of Pilsener.

== Plot ==
As described in a film magazine review, Frederick, Prince of Pilsen, rebelling against his coming marriage with Princess Bertha of Thorwald, meets Hans Wagner, a brewer, and his daughter Nellie. The brewer, mistaking the prince for the son of a friend, asks him to join in a banquet. Hans becomes intoxicated, dresses up in a uniform, and is then mistaken by a coachman for the prince and brought to the palace. The real prince and the daughter start out in pursuit, but are waylaid by bandits. The marriage preparations at the palace are completed. Meanwhile, Hans is denounced as an imposter and it is ordered that he be shot. He is rescued in time by Frederick and his daughter Nellie. Princess Bertha, sensing the prince's devotion to the young woman, releases him from his promise to wed her, and discovers that she has fallen in love with Hans, the brewer.

== Cast ==
- George Sidney as Hans Wagner
- Anita Stewart as Nellie, His Daughter
- Allan Forrest as Frederick, Prince of Pilsen
- Myrtle Stedman as Princess Bertha of Thorwald
- Otis Harlan as Bandit Chief
- Rose Tapley as Lady in Waiting
- Wilhelm von Brincken as Captain of the Guard
- William von Hardenburg as Court Physician
