= Charlotte Wiehe-Berény =

Danish ballet dancer and actress

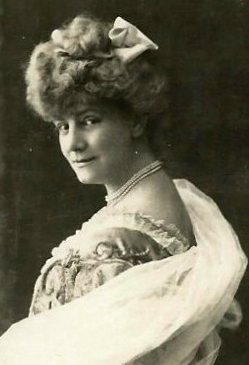
- Wiehe-Berény, c.1908
- Born: Marie Charlotte Hansen; 28 August 1865; Copenhagen, Denmark
- Died: 4 September 1947 (aged 82); Skodsborg, Denmark
- Resting place: Assistens Cemetery
- Years active: 1874 — 1932
- Spouse(s): Wilhelm Wiehe (1889–1899); Henri Berény (1899–1920, 1929–1932)
- Children: 1
- Parent(s): Emma Cathinka Flor, Jacob Julius Georg Hansen
- Awards: Ingenio et arti (1940)

Marie Charlotte Wiehe-Berény (28 August 1865 – 4 September 1947) was a Danish actress, ballet dancer and singer. In 1940, she received the Ingenio et arti medal.

== Personal life and family ==
She was born on 28 August 1865 to Emma Cathinka Hansen (née Flor), aged 33, and Jacob Julius Georg Hansen, aged 39 and had seven other siblings. Her father died when Charlotte was just 3 years old. Her mother single-handedly raised the eight children and ran a hat shop in Gammel Mønt.

On 5 June 1889, she married silent actor Wilhelm Wiehe (10 February 1858–18 August 1916). Their marriage lasted 10 years and they had a son named Bent Wiehe (born 11 November 1895); however, when Charlotte remarried later, his name was changed to Bent Wiehe-Berény.

Her second marriage was to Hungarian violinist and composer Henri Berény (1 January 1871–22 March 1932). They got married on 7 December 1899 in Copenhagen and moved to Paris a year later. The marriage was terminated in 1920, but on 6 August 1929, they remarried at Copenhagen City Hall.

In 1929, she wrote her memoir Fra Gammel Mønt til den store Verden (English: From Gammel Mønt to the Wide World). She died on 4 September 1947 in Skodsburg and is buried at Assistens Cemetery with her parents and two brothers.

== Career ==
Charlotte was admitted to the Royal Danish Theatre in 1874, where she trained as a ballet dancer under Georg Brodersen and took roles in August Bournonville's works. Then from 1881–1890, she was employed by the theatre.

In 1890, after being passed over a promotion within the ballet, she turned to acting and accepted a position at Copenhagen's Folketeatret. She performed in operettas and comedies at Folketeatret and Casino becoming one of the favourites of her day. After she married Henri Berény, they moved to Paris and Charlotte embarked on an international career in theatre and silent films where she toured Europe and America.

During the First World War, the couple's wealth was seized by the French authorities as Henri Berény was Hungarian. Charlotte only returned to Denmark after Berény's death in 1932, where she remained relatively poor but still appeared on stage.

== Filmography ==
- The Hand (1907, French: La Main)
- The Doll Man (1909, French: L'homme aux poupées)
- Bankerot (1912)
- Lotte vil paa Landet (1916)
