= Monte Carlo (musical) =

Edwardian musical comedy composed by Howard Talbot

Monte Carlo is an Edwardian musical comedy in two acts with a book by Sidney Carlton, music by Howard Talbot and lyrics by Harry Greenbank. The work was first performed at the Avenue Theatre in London, opening on 27 August 1896. The New York production, which opened on March 21, 1898, at the Herald Square Theatre, was directed by Frank Smithson, who also played General Boomerang.

== Roles and original casts ==
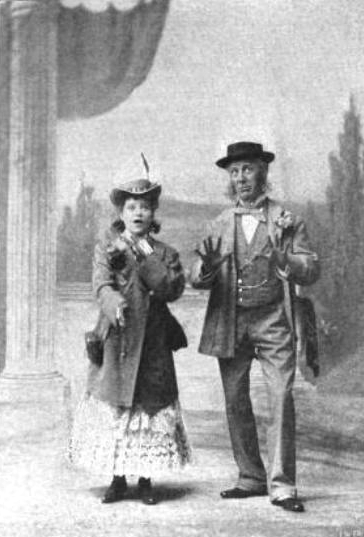
Lalor Shiel as Little Jemima and Charles Rock as Sir Benjamin Currie

Role	Premiere Cast, August 1896	Broadway Cast, March 1898
Sir Benjamin Currie, Q.C., M.P., The Attorney General	Charles Rock	Thomas F. Kearns
General Frederick Boomerang, V.C.	Eric Lewis	Frank Smithson
Fred Dorian, a Lieutenant in the Southshire Regiment	Richard Green	Augustus Cramer
James, a waiter	E. W. Garden	Alex Clark
Harry Verinder, a briefless barrister	A. Vane Tempest	Sidney De Gray
Professor Lorrimer	Robb Harwood	Edward Chapman
Belmont, visitor at Monte Carlo	Guy Fane	Edward Thomas
Standring, visitor at Monte Carlo	C. Wilford	Frank H. Crane
Captain Rossiter, captain of the Steam Yacht "Silver Swan"	W. H. Kemble	William McNeill
A croupier	Roland Carse	Gus Kremer
Francois, Sir Benjamin's valet	Edward Espinosa	James Grant
Mrs. Carthew	Aïda Jenoure	Jeannie Winston
Dorothy, Mrs. Carthew's Daughter	Kate Cutler	Marguerite Sylva
Ethel, General Boomerang's Daughter	Hettis Lund	Helene Tuesart
Gertie Gelatine, sister of Bertie	May Belfry	Sadie Kirby
Bertie Gelatine, sister of Gertie	Venie Belfry	Marie Cahill
Little Jemima, East End Music Hall performer	Lalor Shiel	Josie Sadler
A midshipman	Kitty Abrahams	Susie Brown
Susanne, a chambermaid at the Hôtel de Paris	Emmie Owen	Gerome Edwardy

== Musical numbers ==
Act I

- Opening Chorus - "Here at Monte Carlo's tables, all our hopes on fortune staking..."
- Recit. and Song - Croupier & Chorus - "Now here's a chance for visitors, both masculine and feminine..."
- Duet - Ethel & Harry - "Within my chambers daily I sit before my table..."
- Trio - Sir Benjamin, General, & Mrs. Carthew - "When a widow makes impression with her beauty rich and regal..."
- Song - Dorothy - "O land of heart's desire where love is king, and fancy all a-fire..."
- Duet - Dorothy & Dorian - "Along the way where lovers go the roses red are twining..."
- Duet - Suzanne & James - "The use of French you ask of me, but spite of your professions..."
- Song - Dorian & Men's Chorus - "They tell me that life is a riddle; but whatever may chance..."
- Song & March - General Boomerang & Chorus - "Have you ever heard the story of my long career of glory..."
- Quartette & Dance - Bertie, Gertie, James & Lorrimer - "I am Gertie Gelatine, and it's easy to be seen..."
- Song - Jemima & Chorus - "I'm the pet of all the 'alls - I'm Jemima! And they whistles and they calls for Jemima..."
- Duet and Dance - Jemima & Sir Benjamin - "A worthy rural Dean a pair of legs could boast of..."
- Hornpipe Trio - Mrs. Carthew, General & Sir Benjamin - "If you'll only come a-cruising..."
- Finale Act I - "Oh, what is the matter? Oh, what has occurr'd? ..."

Act II

- Chorus of Sailors - "We're an able bodied crew, and our duty is to wrestle..."
- Recit and Song - Captain Rossiter - "O gallant tars..." & "Before I sail'd this elegant craft..."
- Trio - Mrs. Carthew, Dorothy, Suzanne & Chorus - "Now of course you know the duties of a lady's maid..."
- Song - Mrs. Carthew - "When you meet some lovely syren who has big bewitching eyes..."
- Song - General - "We have distinguish'd visitors in England now and then..." ***
- Quartette - Mrs. Carthew, Dorothy, General & Sir Benjamin - "Whatever's the use of a maid..."
- Song - Lorrimer - "Oh, the autumn leaves are falling and the days are closing in..." (6 verses)
- Eccentric Dance (Francois)
- Concerted Piece - "Across the waters blue we're very proud to see..."
- Recit. & Song - Dorian - "Back from the field..." & "Oh, the Scarlet Coat so bright is an Englishman's delight..."
- Skirt Dance and Can-Can
- Song - Bertie, with Gertie, Sir Benjamin & Lorrimer - "I'm a stupid little maiden who's afraid to venture out..."
- Colour Duet & Dance - Suzanne & James - "In the mediaeval ages with their troubadours and pages..."
- Duet - Jemima & Lorrimore - "Two Spanish senora are we, exceedingly giddy and gushing..."
- Song - Dorian - "No eloquence is mine my cause to plead whose music it were dear delight to heed..."
- Song - "Fiddle di diddle di diddle di dee" (singer unspecified) - "A very prim and prudent maid..." ***
- Finale Act II - "When man to maid proposes - O Day of dear delight!..."
