= The Lancers =

Musical by Rida Johnson Young and J. Hartley Manners

The Lancers is a musical in three acts. The musical's book by Rida Johnson Young and J. Hartley Manners was adapted from Augustin Daly's 1881 play The Passing Regiment. Daly's play itself was based on Gustav von Moser and Franz von Schonthan's 1880 German-language play Krieg im Freiden (English: War in Peace). The musical had several contributing composers and lyricists, including Cecilia Loftus, George Spink, Milton Lusk, and Arthur Gumble to name just a few. The work premiered on Broadway at Daly's Theatre on December 5, 1907 with a cast that included Cecilia Loftus as Marcia Tremaine and Lawrence D'Orsay as Captain Cecil Fitzherbert. It was directed by Frank Smithson and produced by brothers Lee and Jacob J. Shubert.
