= Charles M. Fair =

American writer and neuroscientist (1916–2014)

Charles Maitland Fair
- Born: September 18, 1916
- Died: July 28, 2014 (aged 97)
- Occupations: Neuroscience researcher and writer
- Parents: Charles Maitland Fair (father); Gertrude Bryan (mother)

Charles Maitland Fair (September 18, 1916 – July 28, 2014) was an American neuroscience researcher and writer.

== Early life and education ==
Fair was born in New York City. His mother was the stage actress Gertrude Bryan. He attended the Buckley School, Fay School, and St. Paul's. Fair attended Yale University but was asked to leave before graduating.

== Career ==
Fair began to study the nervous system in the late 1950s out of his conviction that psychiatric theories of the self had failed. In spite of his lack of a college degree, Fair distinguished himself as an independent scholar by holding several prestigious positions and writing three books on neuroscience. He was a Guggenheim Fellow at UCLA's Brain Research Institute and worked as a scientist for MIT's Neuroscience Research Program and Massachusetts General Hospital. Fair published several technical papers and contributed to the academic journals Science and Nature.

== Writing ==
Fair wrote poetry, literary commentary, and screenplays. He published light verse in Punch and The New Yorker, wrote book reviews for the Providence Journal and the Washington Post, and had a column in the American Poetry Review. Fair wrote and narrated the soundtrack for the original Salem Witch Museum in Salem, Massachusetts. He wrote three non-technical books on the subjects of the history of war (From the Jaws of Victory) and cultural criticism (The Dying Self; The New Nonsense: The End of the Rational Consensus).

== Skepticism ==
Fair was a skeptic and early member of the Committee for Skeptical Inquiry. Fair's The New Nonsense critically examined pseudoscience and paranormal topics such as mind control, ESP, UFOs, and Velikovsky's cataclysm theory. He pleaded for "rational renaissance" and praised reason as a guard against looming fascistic revolution and cultural decay.

== Personal life ==
Fair had a diverse range of occupations and interests. He worked as a jazz pianist, banana importer, computer company executive, editor, poet, writer, neuroscientist, and historian. He enjoyed sailing and played the vibraphone. "By doing a great many things and failing at half of them I found out who I really am, and something about what the world is really like," said Fair of his own life.

== Publications ==
- The Physical Foundations of the Psyche (1963)
- The Dying Self (1969)
- From the Jaws of Victory (1971)
- The New Nonsense: The End of the Rational Consensus (1974)
- Memory & Central Nervous Organization (1988)
- Cortical Memory Functions (1992)
