= Lord Piccolo =

Operetta by Henri Berény, Rudolph Schanzer and Carl Lindau

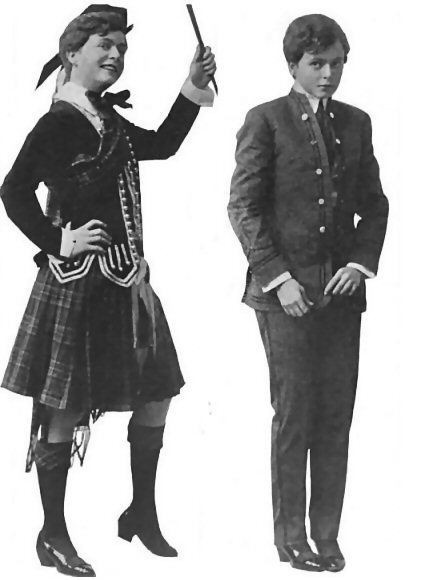
Gertrude Bryan as Daisy in Little Boy Blue, the 1911 Broadway version of Lord Piccolo.

Lord Piccolo is an operetta in two acts with music by Henri Berény and a German-language libretto by Rudolph Schanzer & Carl Lindau. It premiered at the Johann Strauss Theater in Vienna on 9 January 1910. When the work was later adapted into the English language for Broadway by A. E. Thomas and Edward A. Paulton, their modified version retitled the work Little Boy Blue. The operetta is about a Scottish Earl's niece who impersonates her missing brother in order to obtain his inheritance from their uncle.

== Plot ==
The Earl of Goberdeen is trying to locate his missing nephew who is heir to his Scottish fortune. His last known whereabouts were in the city of Paris, and the earl has hired a detective, Dupont, to look for him in that city. Dupont can not locate the earl's nephew, but succeeds in finding his sister Daisy, the earl's niece, who is working as a barmaid in Paris. She also does not know where her brother is, having separated from him since they were children. Meanwhile, the Earl of Goberdeen obtains the services of Amaranth, a fortune teller and seer, to locate his nephew.

Frustrated at his failure and desiring to fulfill his contract with the Earl of Goberdeen, Dupont convinces Daisy to go to Scotland and pretend to be her brother. He successfully disguises her as a boy. A comedy of errors ensues as the two attempt to outsmart the Duke. Matters are further complicated for Daisy by the arrival of her lover Gaston, the Marquis de la Tour, who has followed her from Paris, and may reveal her identity. Fortunately he does not recognize her in her disguise. Eventually Daisy's identity is revealed upon her brother's return. All ends well when she and Gaston become engaged to be married.

== Lord Piccolo becomes Little Boy Blue ==
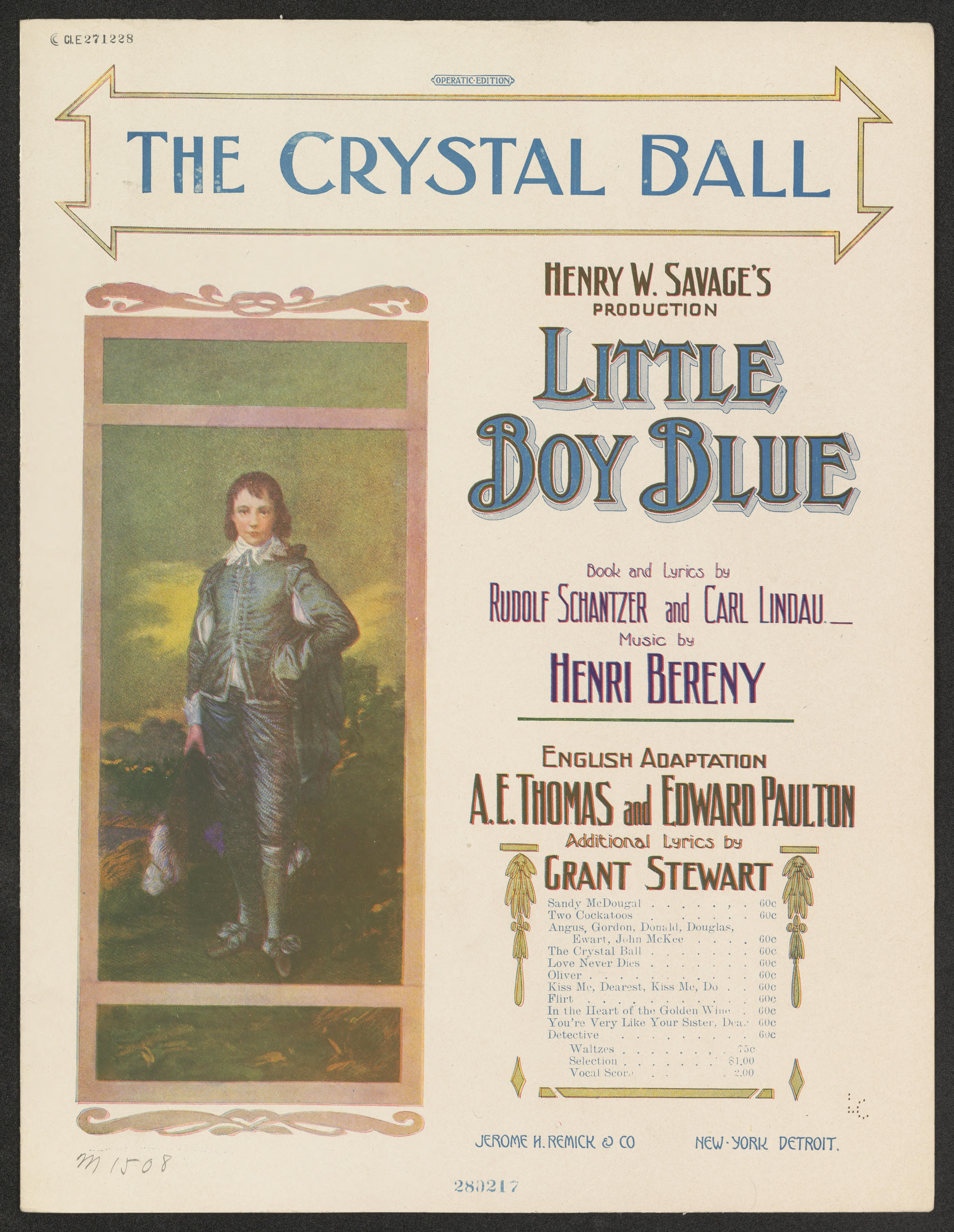
Sheet music for the song "The Crystal Ball" from Little Boy Blue. Published by Jerome H. Remick & Co. in 1911.

American opera producer Henry W. Savage decided to adapt Henri Berény's German language operetta Lord Piccolo for the American stage. He hired playwrights Albert Ellsworth Thomas (1873–1947) and Edward A. Paulton (1866–1939) to adapt the libretto by Shanzer and Lindau into English; ultimately resulting in the operetta being retitled Little Boy Blue. Thomas and Paulton wrote most of the new lyrics to the show but there were also contributions by other writers, including William F. Kirk and Edward Madden.

While much of Berény's original score was still in use, there were also many changes made to the operetta's score for its Broadway production, including some new material by Berény himself. Paulton also contributed new music to the show, as did composers Paul Rubens and Arthur Weld. Weld also served as the music director for the New York production which was staged by Frank Smithson and choreographed by Jack Mason.

Little Boy Blue premiered at Broadway's Lyric Theatre on November 27, 1911, where it ran for 176 performances; closing on April 27, 1912. The production then toured nationally, briefly returning to Broadway for eight more performances at the Grand Opera House in April 1913; making its total number of Broadway performances 184. The cast was led by actress Gertrude Bryan in the role of Daisy. Others in the cast included John Dunsmure as The Earl of Goberdeen, Otis Harlan as Dupont, Charles Meakins as Gaston, and Maude Odell as Amaranth.
