= Frank Smithson =

Irish-American actor & director (1861–1949)

Frank Smithson (11 February 1861 – 15 January 1949, New York City) was an Irish born American actor and theatre and film director. He began his career as a leading comic actor in Britain in the late 1880s and 1890s. He immigrated to the United States in 1896; making his Broadway debut in December of that year both directing and starring as Major Fossdyke in the Edwardian musical comedy The Girl from Paris. He directed 250 productions for the American stage during his lengthy career, many of them for Broadway, and was also active as a film director for Edison Studios and Mack Sennett's Keystone Studios.

== Early career in Britain ==
Frank Smithson was born on 11 February 1861 in Tralee, Ireland. He began his career as an actor. From May–July 1887 he toured the British provinces as Jinks in Harry Monkhouse's Larks; portraying that role at the Theatre Royal, West Hartlepool, and the Prince of Wales Theatre, Salford. He spent the remainder of that year touring in the leading comic role of Dick Kavanagh in William Howell Poole's The Game of Life; appearing at The Grand Theatre, Islington, the Royal Court Theatre, the Prince's Theatre, Manchester, and at provincial theaters in Middlesbrough, and Chester. In 1888-1889 he toured the British provinces as a leading comic actor in J. B. Mulholland's theatre troupe; starring as Joel Scovendyke in Mulholland's Mizpah and Ginger Jim in Mulholland's Disowned.

For the Christmas season of 1889, Smithson appeared in a new pantomime with Mulholland's company at the Grand Theatre, Nottingham; portraying the drag role of Airie Annie in Goddard Wyatt's Dick Whittington and His Cat. In 1890 he performed the roles of Pendleton in Robert Williams Buchanan's Sweet Nancy at the Lyric Theatre, London; Tom Honeywood in George Robert Sims's Master and Man at the Theatre Royal, Wolverhampton; and starred in the title roles of Pepper's Diary at the Royalty Theatre in London and Muldoon's Picnic at the Grand Theatre, Nottingham; also portraying the latter part at other provincial theatres that year.

In 1891 Smithson produced his first play, a new burlesque by Walpole Lewin entitled Good Old Queen Bess. It premiere at the Vaudeville Theatre, London on 3 June 1891 with Smithson portraying the role of Julius the Jester. After this he toured the British provinces for the remainder of the year as Cerberus in Edward Rose and A. Coe's burlesque Orpheus and Eurydice; including performances in Scotland. In 1892 he was once again touring the British provinces with J. B. Mulholland's theatre troupe as Dr. Gondimar Gulf in Arthur H Gilbert and Charles Renad's The Swiss Express. He ended that year at the Alexandra Theatre, Sheffield as Captain Blowhard in the Christmas pantomime Sinbad the Sailor; a role he continued to play through March 1893.

In the summer of 1893 Smithson joined the theatre troupe of actor Charles Lauri; touring with his company as Schwindlewitz in J. W. Mabson's Le Voyage en Suisse through the autumn of that year. He then portrayed Baron Badenuff in a Christmas pantomime of Little Red Riding Hood at the Theatre Royal, Birmingham from December 1893 through February 1894, before returning to touring the British provinces in Le Voyage en Suisse from May through July 1894. In October 1894 he was appearing at the Prince of Wales Theatre, Liverpool as Colonel Hiram Poster in William Gill's The Little Milliner. He then toured the British provinces as Michael Muldoon in The New Muldoon's Picnic in November and December 1894 before closing out the year at the City Theatre in Sheffield performing in another Christmas pantomime.

In January 1895 Smithson returned to Alexandra Theatre to both direct and play the role of Baron Badenuff in Little Red Riding Hood. That production ran through March 1895. He then portrayed the title roles in Dion Boucicault's The Shaughraun and Muldoon's Picnic in Brighton, and portrayed Larry O'Brannigan in Dandy Dick Whittington at the Avenue Theatre in London. That work was renamed The Circus Boy when Smithson toured the British provinces in that role for the remainder of 1895; beginning at the Royal Court Theatre, Liverpool in August. He continued to tour in that part in the early part of 1896. He then toured in provinces as Matthew Vanderkoopen in La Cigale, an English language version of Edmond Audran's La Cigale et la Fourmi, from February through May 1896.

== Move to the United States and early career in America with Edward E. Rice ==
In 1896 Smithson immigrated to the United States; making his American stage debut on October 26, 1896 at the Brooklyn Music Hall as the magician in Samuel H. Speck's burlesque Kaloma the Hoodoo. He was hired by the Broadway producer Edward E. Rice to direct and star in the American premiere of Ivan Caryll and George Dance's Edwardian musical comedy The Girl from Paris. He made his Broadway debut in that work as Major Fossdyke at the Herald Square Theatre on December 8, 1896, and continued to portray that part until the production closed after 248 performances. After this production closed in New York, Smithson continued to portray Major Fossdyke when the production began a national tour in September 1897 at the Park Theatre in Dayton, Ohio. Other theater stops on this tour from September through December 1897 included the Chestnut Street Theatre in Philadelphia, Macauley's Theatre in Louisville, Kentucky, O'Brien's Opera House in Birmingham, Alabama, the Chattanooga Opera House, the Grand Opera House in Indianapolis, Coates Opera House in Kansas City, the Lafayette Square Opera House in Washington D.C., the Metropolitan Opera House in Minneapolis, the Lyceum Theater in Rochester, New York, and the Oliver Opera House in South Bend, Indiana.

Smithson continued to tour in The Girl from Paris in 1898 for performances at the Grand Theater in Evansville, Indiana, the Montauk Theatre in Brooklyn, the Lyceum Theatre in Elmira, New York, the Baldwin Theatre in San Francisco, the Fulton Opera House in Lancaster, Pennsylvania, the Academy of Music in Baltimore, the Metropolitan Theater in Sacramento, California, and the Los Angeles Theater.

Immediately following end of the tour of The Girl from Paris Smithson was hired once again by Rice to direct another Edwardian musical comedy for the Broadway, Howard Talbot and Harry Greenbank's Monte Carlo. It premiered at the Herald Square Theatre in March 1898. As with The Girl from Paris he also starred in this production, portraying the role of General Boomerang.

== Partial list of Broadway directing credits ==
- The Girl from Paris (1896)
- Monte Carlo (1898)
- Mam'selle 'Awkins (1900)
- A Million Dollars (1900)
- The Giddy Throng (1900)
- The King's Carnival (1901)
- The Defender (1902)
- Nancy Brown (1903)
- Winsome Winnie (1903)
- The Good Old Summertime (1904)
- The Royal Chef (1904)
- The Press Agent (1905)
- The Blue Moon (1906)
- Princess Beggar (1907)
- The Orchid (1907)
- The Top o' th' World (1907)
- The Lancers (1907)
- Lonesome Town (1908)
- Marcelle (1908)
- The Queen of the Moulin Rouge (1908)
- The Motor Girl (1909)
- The Belle of Brittany (1909)
- Dr. De Luxe (1911)
- The Girl of My Dreams (1911)
- Little Boy Blue (1911)
- The Rose of Panama (1912)
- Somewhere Else (1913)
- When Dreams Come True (1913)
- High Jinks (1913)
- Anna Held's All Star Variete Jubilee (1913)
- Katinka (1915)
- Go to It (1916)
- Ladies First (1918)
- The Lady in Red (1919)
- Love Birds (1921)
- The Last Waltz (1921)
- The Blushing Bride (1922)
- Red Pepper (1922)
- Sally, Irene and Mary (1922; and 1925 revival)
- Vogues of 1924
- Innocent Eyes (1924)
- Honest Liars (1926)
- Artists and Models of 1930
