= The Last Long Mile =

1917 march by Emil Breitenfeld

- Sheet music of "The Last Long Mile", performed in the Broadway musical Toot-Toot (1918)

Song by Emil Breitenfeld
- Written: 1917
- Published: 1918 by T. B. Harms, Inc.
- Genre: March
- Composer: Emil Breitenfeld

"The Last Long Mile", also known as the "Plattsburg Marching Song", is a World War I–era marching song written in 1917. The song is attributed to Emil Breitenfeld, who wrote the song while serving as a lieutenant in the United States Army.

== History ==
"The Last Long Mile" was originally composed by Emil Breitenfeld while the musician was training with the 17th New York Regiment in Plattsburgh, New York. The song—originally known as either "The Long Last Mile" or the "Plattsburg Marching Song"—quickly became popular with soldiers, and was presented along with other soldier's compositions to the National Board on Army and Navy Camp Music. The board liked the song, and considered it one of the best songs to have been produced in soldier's camps. The song was later featured in the first issue of Music in the Camps, an activity book produced for army and navy training camps.

The song, now renamed "The Last Long Mile", was later featured in Toot Toot (1918), a Broadway musical produced by Henry W. Savage and published by T. B. Harms & Francis, Day & Hunter, Inc.

Following the war and his exit from the army in 1919, Breitenfeld moved to California and wrote music for silent films and stage plays. He was the father of jazz alto saxophonist Paul Desmond.
