= Frank S. Pixley =

American educator, playwright

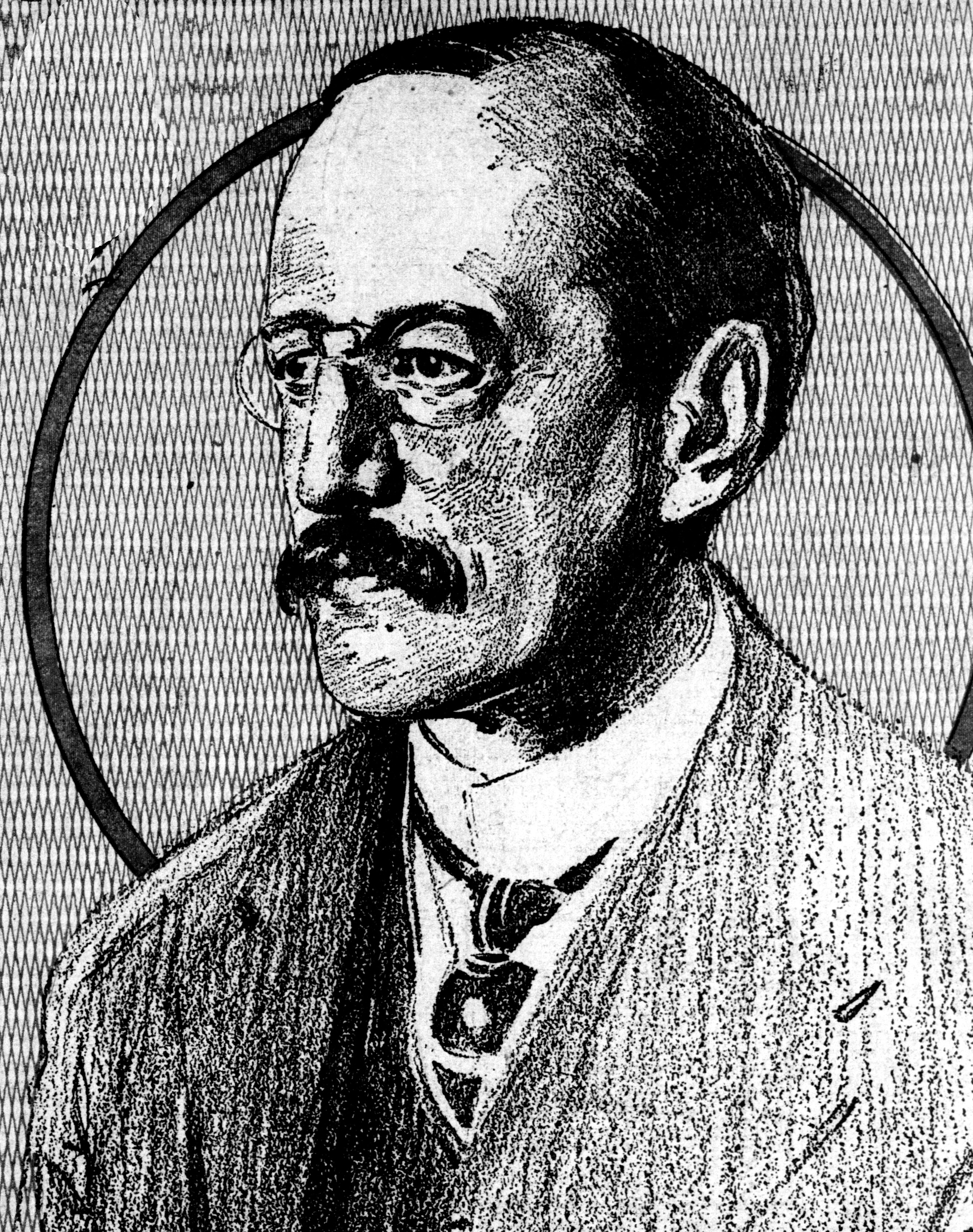
Frank Pixley, librettist, from the San Francisco Call (1913)

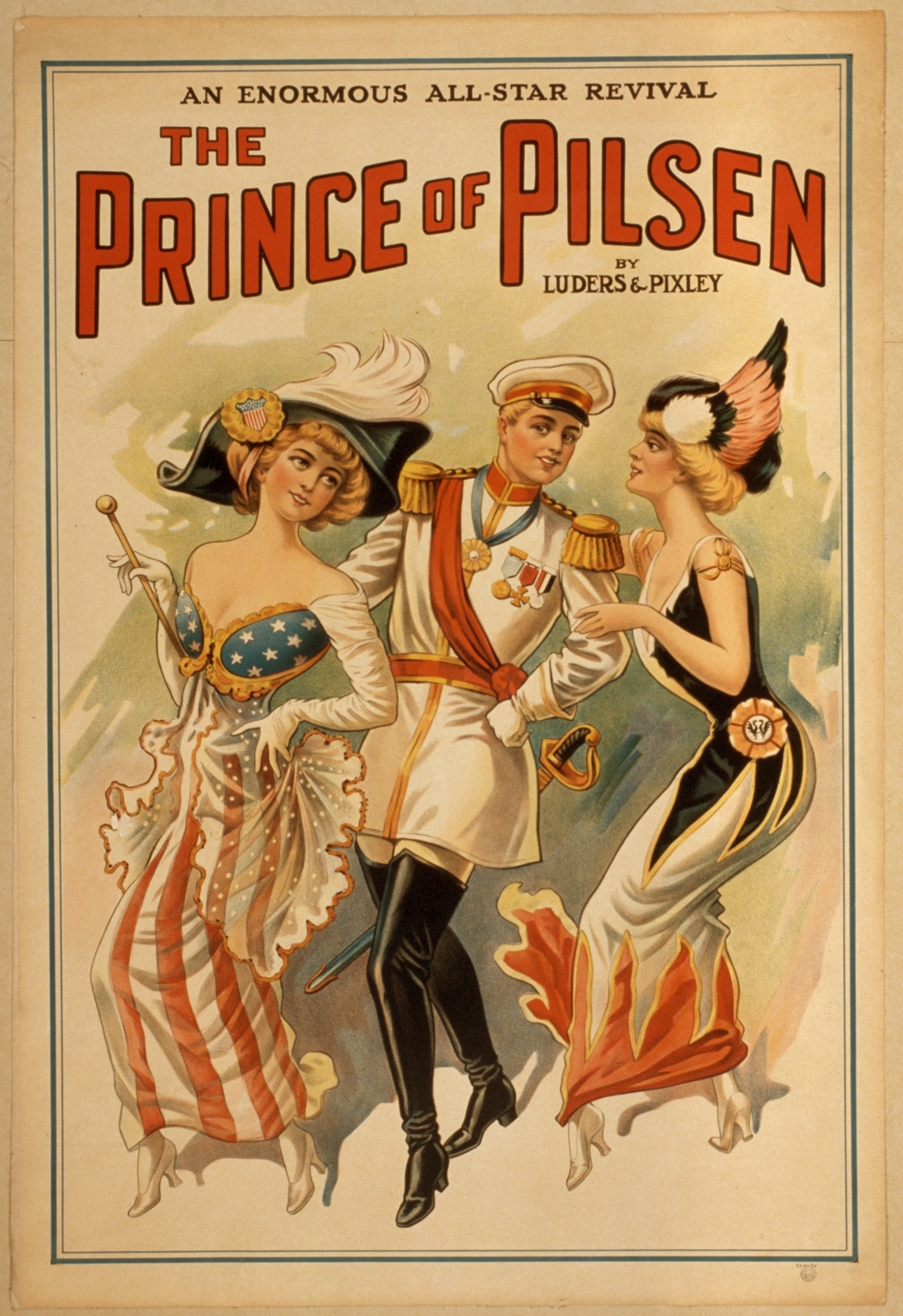
Advertisement for The Prince of Pilsen

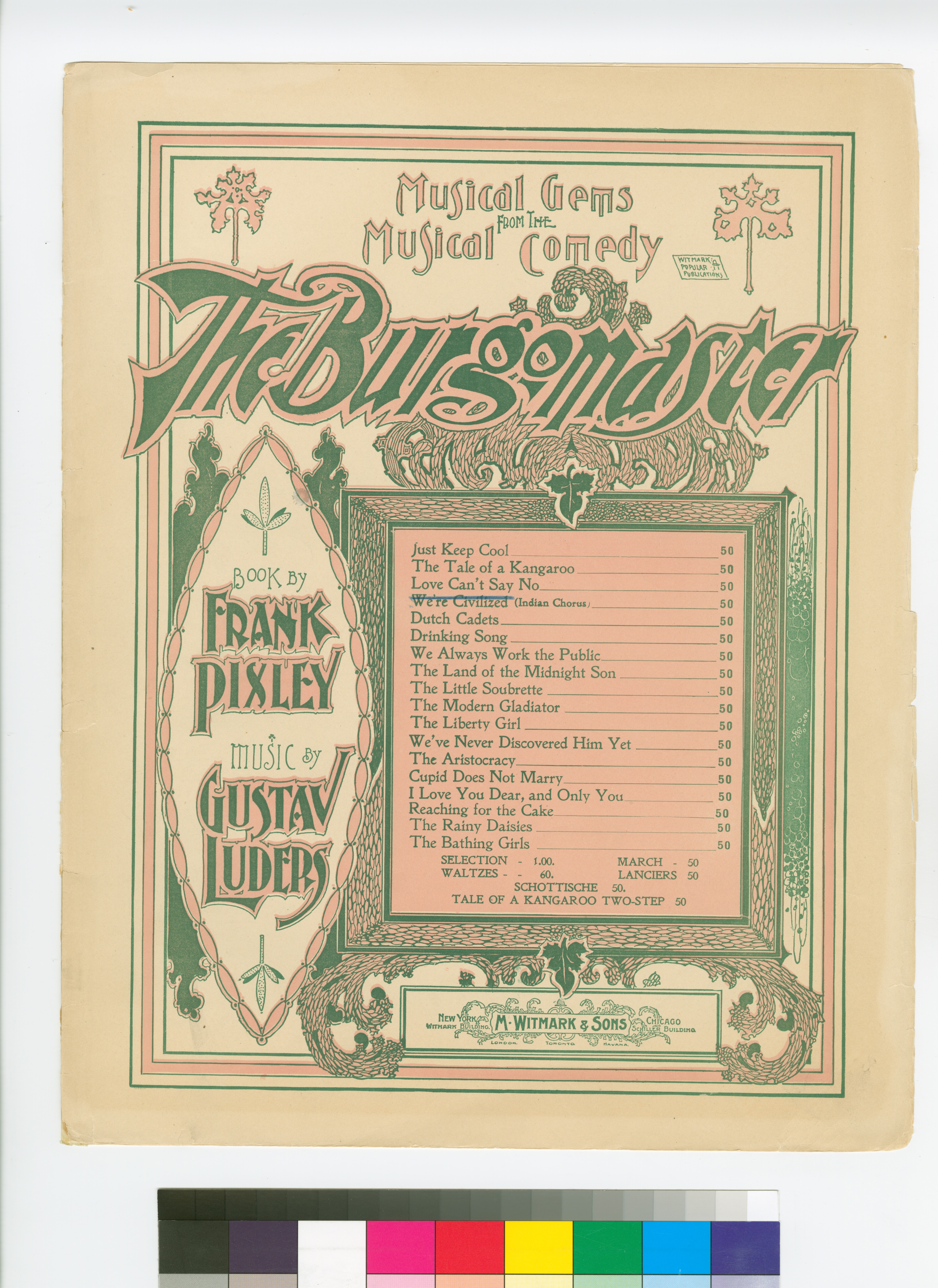
The Burgomaster publication

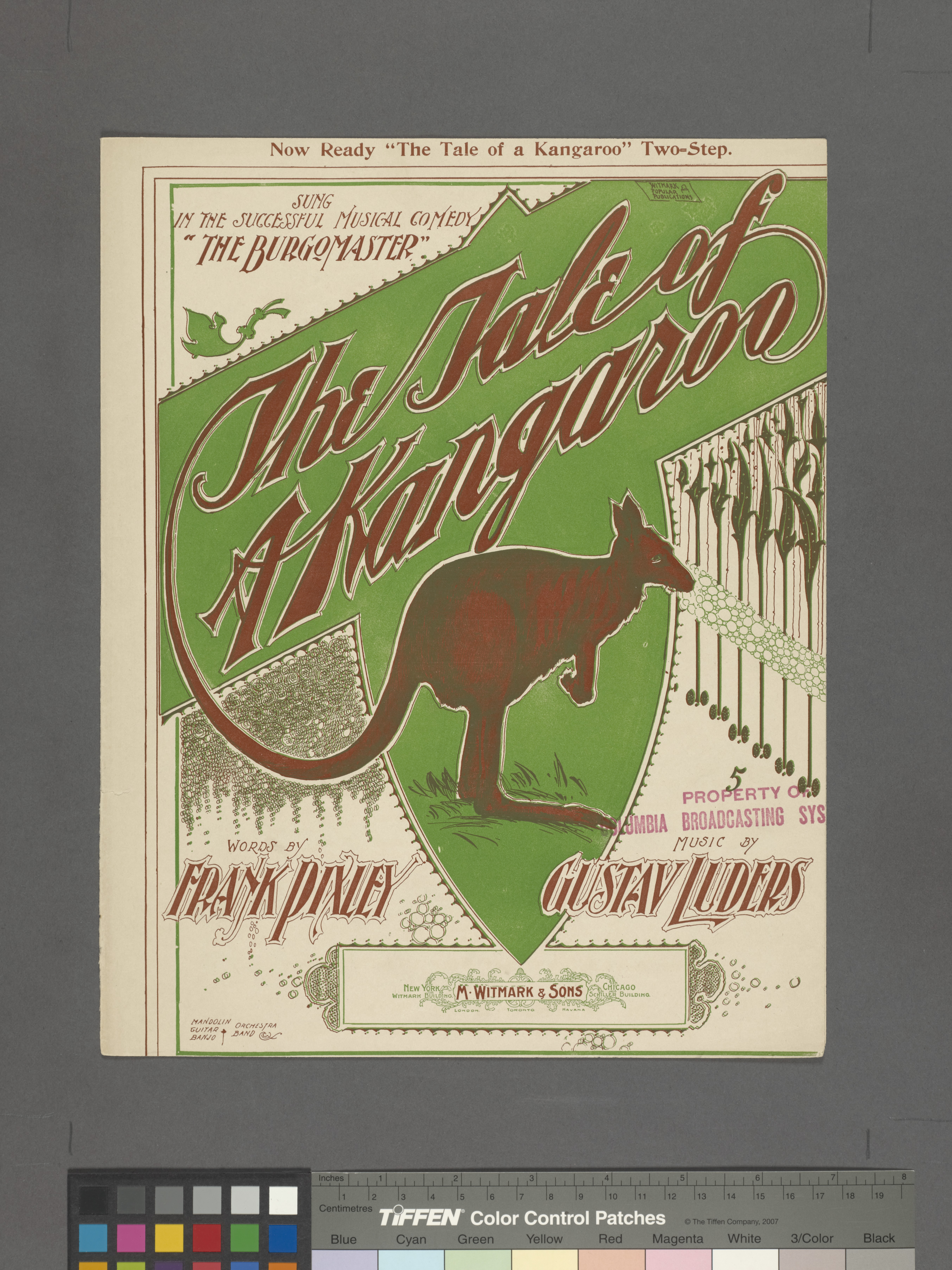
"The Tale of the Kangaroo" two-step cover art from The Burgomaster

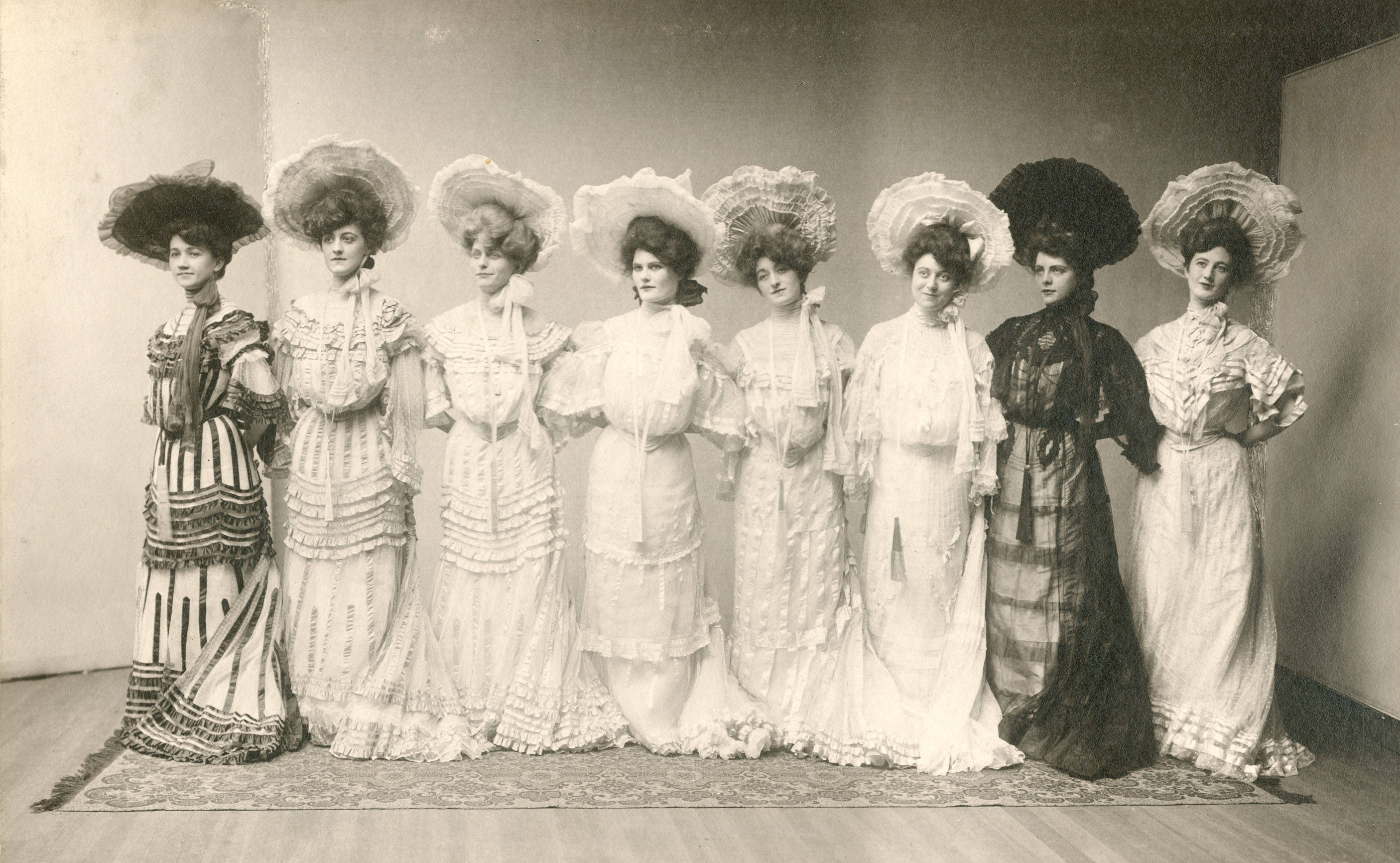
The chorus from The Burgomaster

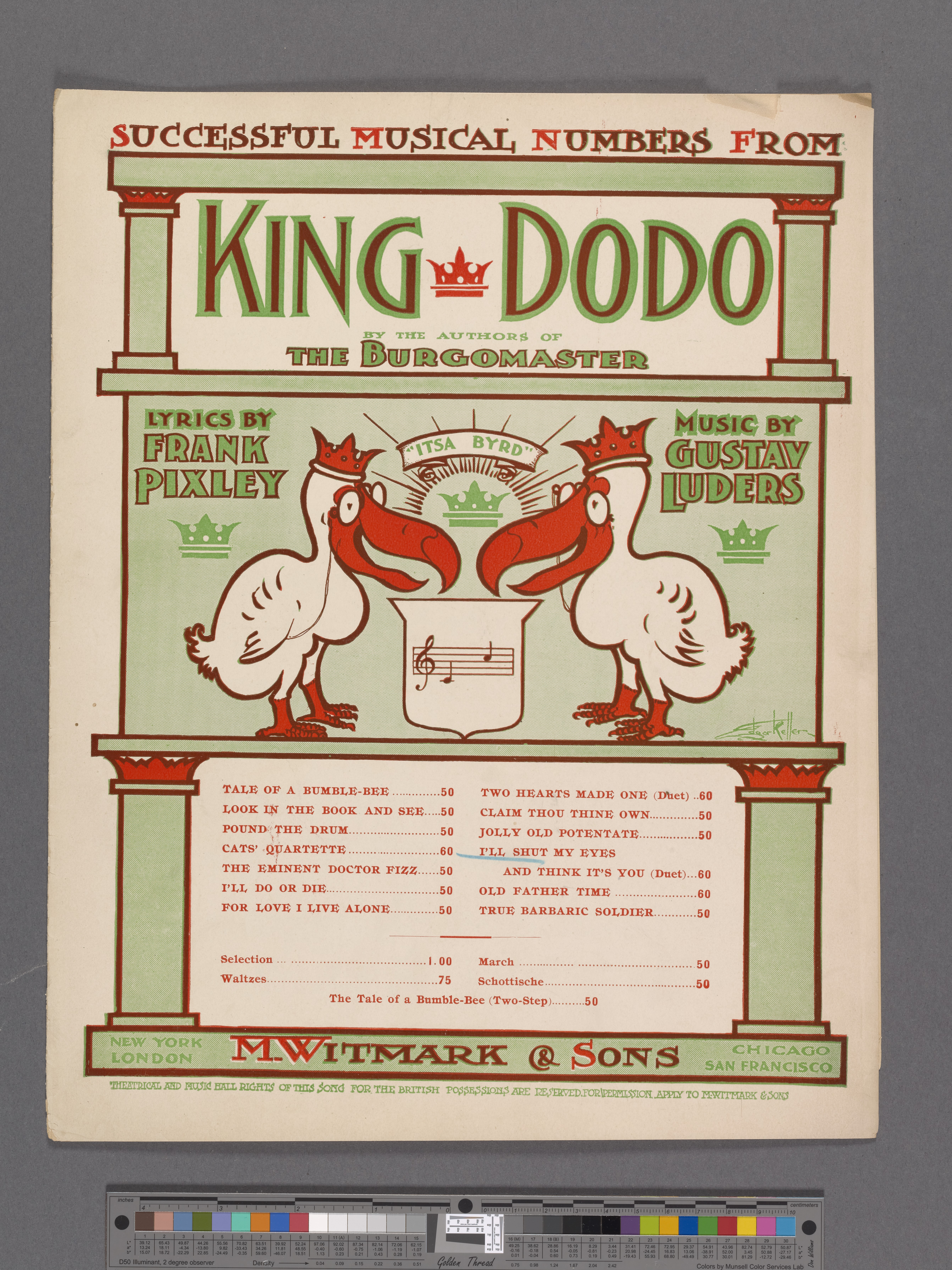
Songbook from King Dodo

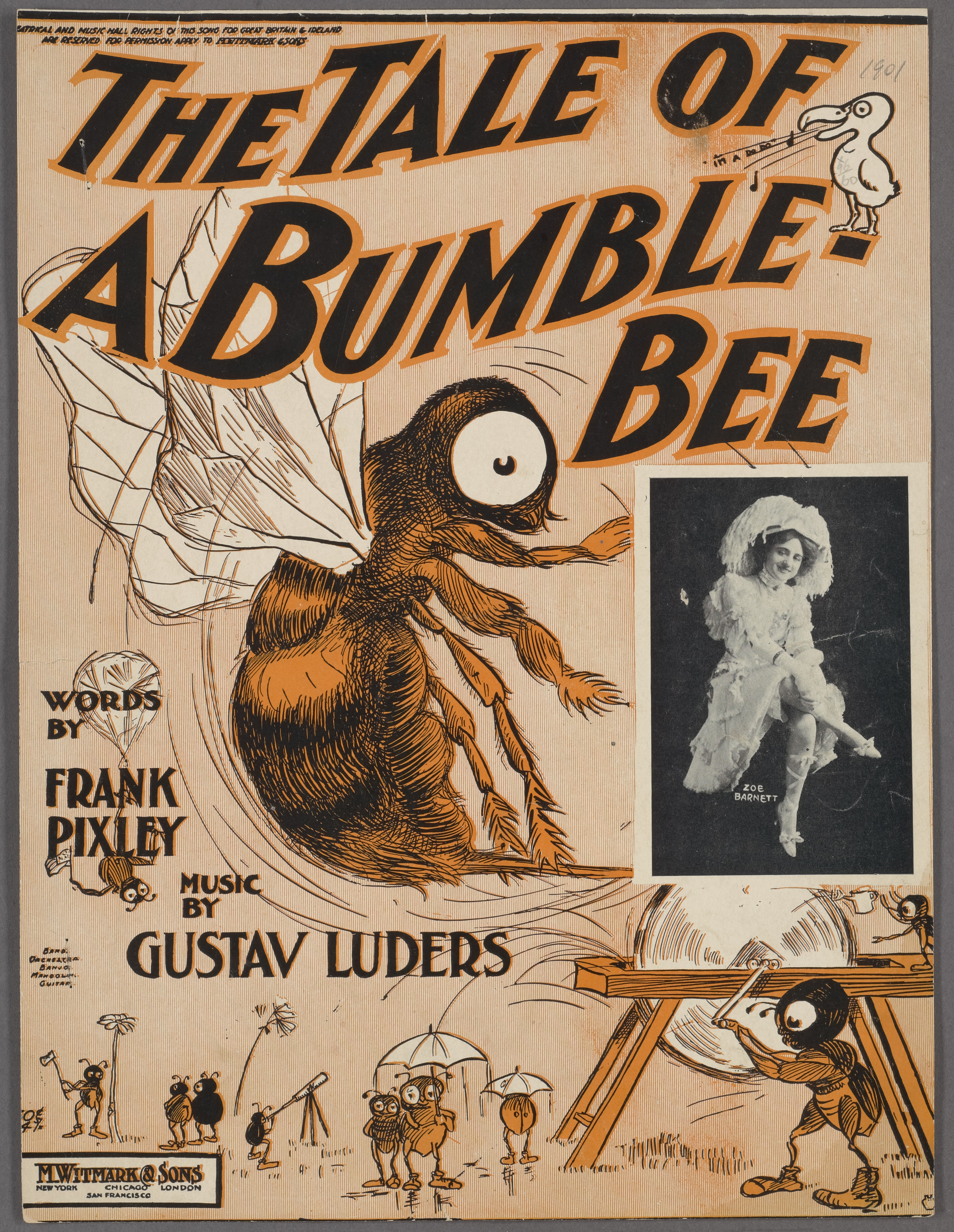
"The Tale of the Bumblebee" with an inset photograph of Zoe Barnett

Frank S. Pixley (November 21, 1865 or 1867 – 1919) was an American educator, newspaper editor, playwright and lyricist. He partnered with Gustav Luders, Pixley writing words and lyrics and Luders the music for several shows. American Musical Productions describes the team as Pixley and Luders became the Rodgers and Hammerstein of the 1900s.

== Early life and education ==
He was born in Richfield, Ohio, son of Maria Louise Pixley . He attended Richfield High School. He graduated from Buchtel College in 1890 and Ohio State University.

== Career ==
He edited the Chicago Times from 1899 to 1902. He wrote several plays including The Prince of Pilsen with music by Gustav Luders. It was adapted into the 1926 film The Prince of Pilsen.

== Personal life ==
He married Isabel MacRoy (died 1929) who bequeathed $50,000 to Buchtel College in honor of her husband.

== Works ==
- A Glimpse of Paradise
- Florodora, adaptation for American stage
- The Burgomaster (1900), music by Gustav Luders
- King Dodo (1901), music by Gustav Luders
- The Prince of Pilsen (1902), music by Gustav Luders
- Marcelle (1908), music by Gustav Luders, starring Louise Gunning
- Woodland (1904), music by Gustav Luders
- The Grand Mogul (1907), music by Gustav Luders
- The Carpet Bagger (1896), adapted into a novel by Opie Read
- The Return of Eve
- The Enchanted Isle
- The Gypsy (1912)
- Apollo (1915)
- A Social Call (1915)
- The So-Gun
- Taming a Tartar (1914)
- Doctor Doolittle (1914)
