= Somewhere Else (musical) =

1913 Broadway musical

Somewhere Else is a musical in two acts with music by Gustav Luders and both book and lyrics by Avery Hopwood. It premiered at the Broadway Theatre on January 20, 1913. It was harshly reviewed in the press and lasted only one week on Broadway. It was Luders' final stage work, and he died of a heart attack on January 24, 1913, during this production's brief run, an event which may have been precipitated by the stress of the public negative reaction to the work. The production closed on January 25, 1913, after just eight performances.

Directed by Frank Smithson and produced by Henry W. Savage, Somewhere Else starred Cecil Cunningham as Mary VII, Queen of the fictional country "Somewhere Else".
