= Gus Heege =

American dramatist

- Born: Augustus J. Heege; 1862; Cleveland, Ohio, U.S.
- Died: February 2, 1898 (aged 36); Cleveland, Ohio, U.S.
- Occupations: Playwright, actor
- Spouse: Mary Lillian "Lilly" Mandeville
- Children: 1

Augustus J. "Gus" Heege (1862 – February 2, 1898) was an American playwright and actor, whose works were popular at the end of the 19th century.

== Early life ==
A native of Cleveland, Ohio, Gus Heege was the son of a prominent member of the city's police department. He attended the district school in nearby Brecksville where he entertained his fellow students with all manner of performances, giving an early indication of his acting talents. Soon after graduating from Cleveland's Central High School, he headed East to seek his fortune on the New York stage.

== Career ==
A talented actor, Heege often took the leading role in his productions. Although his output was varied, he is largely remembered for the Swedish immigrant trilogy, Ole Olson (1889), Yon Yonson (1890) and Yenuine Yentleman (1895). These plays established the character of the comic Swedish immigrant in American theater.

Heege, who was of German ancestry, maintained that careful observation of the newcomers had enabled him to faithfully portray them on stage. A newspaper account told of his field research in the "Little Scandinavia" of northern Wisconsin, where large numbers of Swedes, Norwegians and Danes had settled.

Not everyone found his characters believable. In reviewing Yon Yonson a critic wrote: "The hero is a Swede who speaks English with Scandinavian dialect, the accuracy of which is vouched for by Mr. William M. Dunlevy, the enterprising manager of the Park Theatre, and Mr. Jacob Litt, the manager of this particular play, who are old log-rollers themselves. We are quite willing to accept their word for it, especially as no man would be likely to invent such a dialect. But the Swedes and Norwegians we have in the East do not speak English in the Yon Yonson way."

The author Willa Cather gave a decidedly negative review to Heege's Rush City in the Nebraska State Journal while conceding that Yon Yonson had been a "very good comedy". In 1931 Cather wrote that before 1913, when her novel O Pioneers! was published, "the Swede had never appeared on the printed page in this country except in broadly humorous sketches; and the humor was based on two peculiarities: his physical strength and his inability to pronounce the letter 'J'".

Ben Hendricks (1868-1930) was the actor most associated with Heege's Scandinavian dialect plays. He starred in all three of them and toured with revivals of Ole Olson until 1912, over twenty years after the play's opening.

== Later years ==
In time Heege's portrayal of Swedish immigrants found both popular and critical acceptance. Heege died at his home in Cleveland on February 2, 1898, of kidney disease.

After the playwright's death, the American Dramatists' Club passed the following resolution: "That in his demise the stage has been deprived of one of its truest dialectic disciples, an actor of refined quality, a pronounced genius in the depiction of Swedish and Scandinavian character, and a cheerful, charitable spirit."

Gus Heege's final work, Amalia Mora, was a Swedish-American opera that premiered in 1901. His son, Philip, also became a Broadway actor.

== Selected works ==
- Wanted: The Earth 1887
- Criss Cross 1888
- Sky Skraper 1888
- Ole Olson 1889
- Yon Yonson 1890
- Rush City 1893
- Yenuine Yentleman 1895
- Amalia Mora 1901

== See also ==
- Scandinavian dialect humor

== Gallery ==
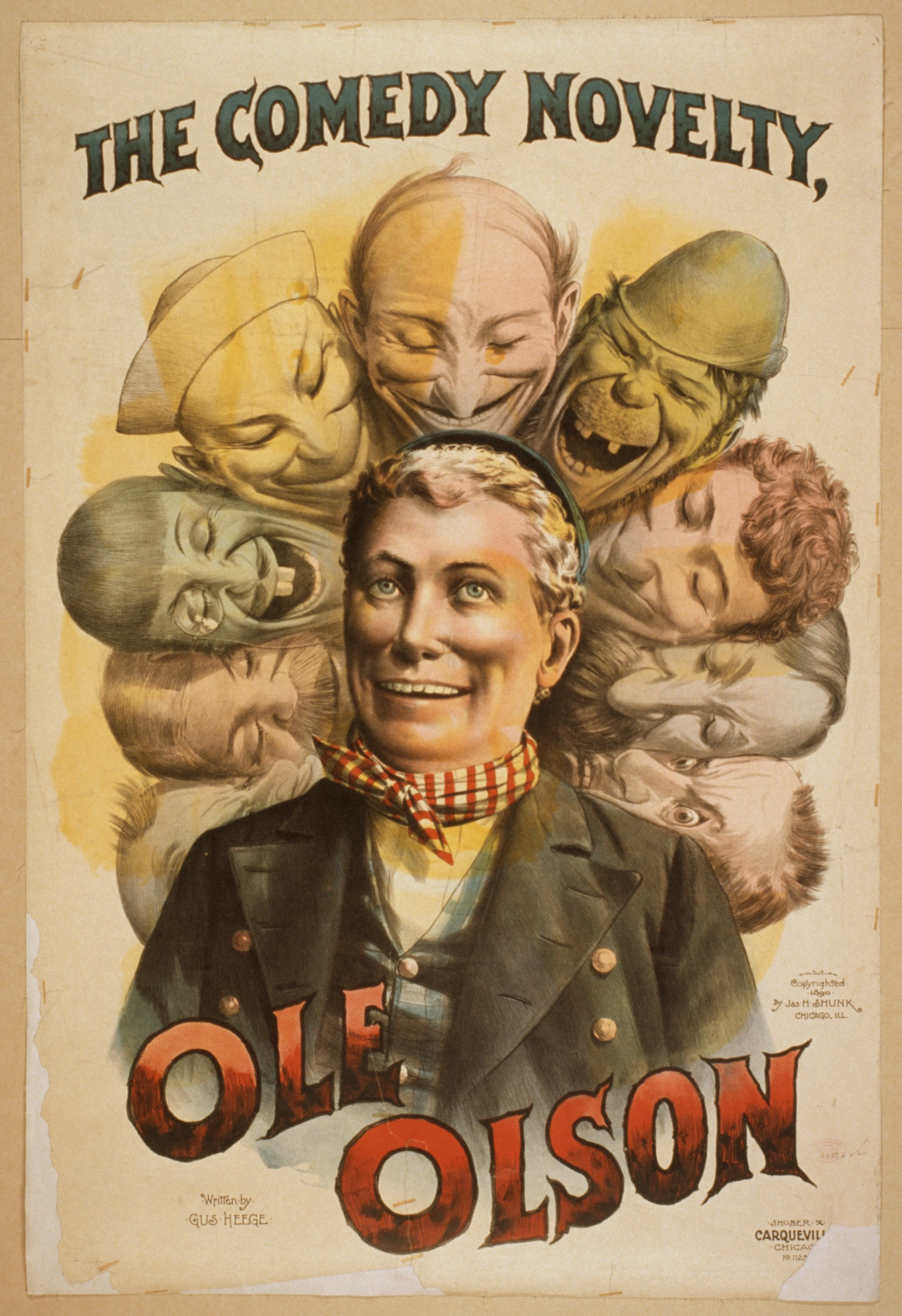
1890 poster for Ole Olson

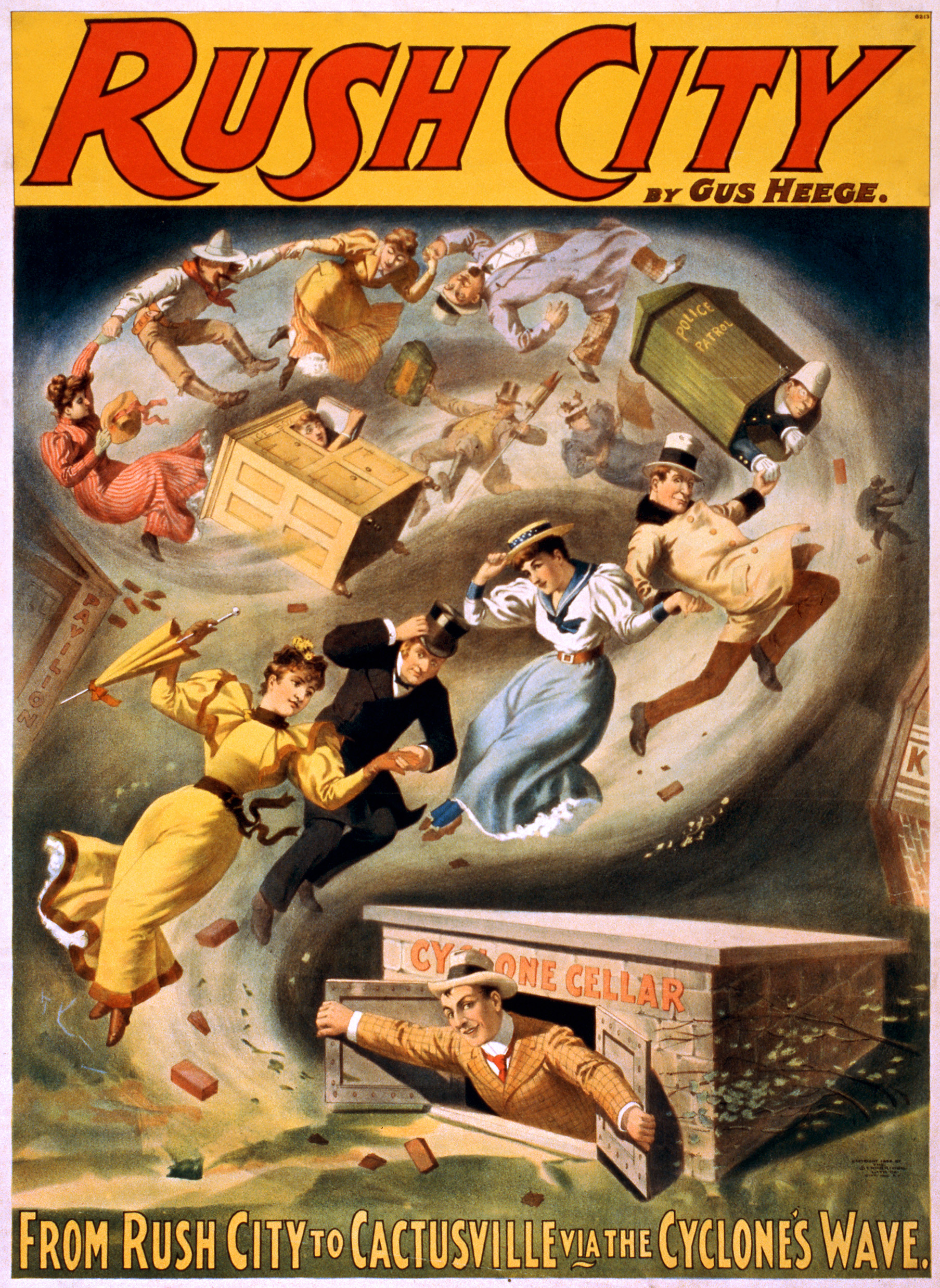
1894 poster for Rush City

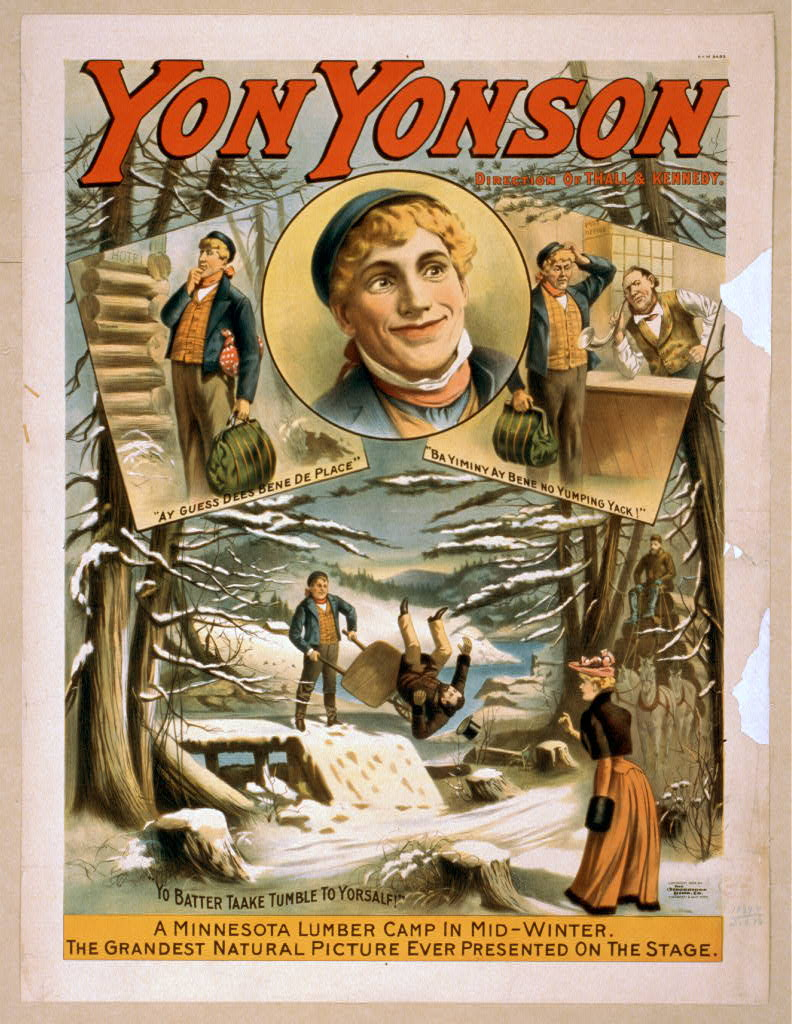
1899 poster for Yon Yonson
