= Louise Gunning =

American actress

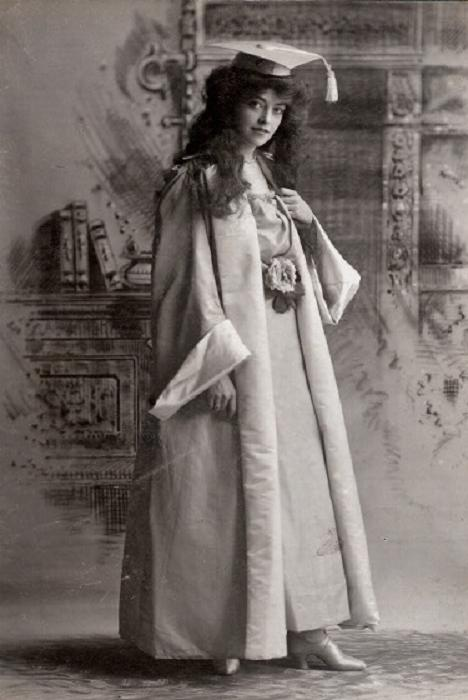
- Born: April 1, 1878; Boston, Massachusetts, US
- Died: July 24, 1960 (aged 82); Sierra Madre, California, US
- Occupation: Musical actress
- Spouse(s): Frederick Pitney, Oskar Seiling

Louise Gunning (1 April 1878 in Boston, Massachusetts, USA – 24 July 1960 in Sierra Madre, California, USA) was an American soprano popular on Broadway in Edwardian musical comedy and comic opera from the late 1890s to the 1910s.

== Early life and career ==
Gunning was born on April 1, 1878, in Boston, Massachusetts, and later lived in Brooklyn, New York, where her father was a Baptist minister. Her mother, Mary Gunning, was a choir director who, besides her daughter, also trained the silent film actress Lucille Lee Stewart. Gunning made her first stage appearances as a chorus singer in a Frank Daniels show and later as a solo act singing Scottish ballads. In 1897 (around the time of her parents' divorce), she appeared in a New York production of The Circus Girl, followed in rapid succession by performances in the Charles H. Hoyt farce comedies A Stranger in New York, A Milk White Flag and A Day and a Night. In the fall of 1899, she sang in the Rogers Brothers hit farce musical The Roger Brothers in Wall Street at the old Victoria Theatre, New York.

In 1902, Gunning sang It Seems Like Yesterday in the Isidore Witmark and Frederic Ranken musical comedy The Chaperons at the Cherry Blossom Theatre, Washington, D. C. and the following year at the Herald Square Theatre she played Arabella in the musical Mr. Pickwick, from the Charles Dickens novel The Pickwick Papers. By the fall of 1903, Gunning was touring with Frank Daniel's company playing Euphemia in The Office Boy by Engländer and Smith, and the following year she appeared at the Broadway Theatre as Laura Skeffington in the Stang and Edwards musical comedy, Love's Lottery. Gunning was Pepi Gloeckner in The White Hen by Gustave Kerker and Roderic C. Penfield in February 1906 at the Casino Theatre, and later that year starred in vaudeville with the Shubert organization in the light opera Véronique. She played Sophia in November 1907 in the comic opera Tom Jones at the Astor Theatre, and in October 1908 the title role in the Frank Pixley and Gustave Luders comic operetta, Marcelle, staged at the Casino Theatre.

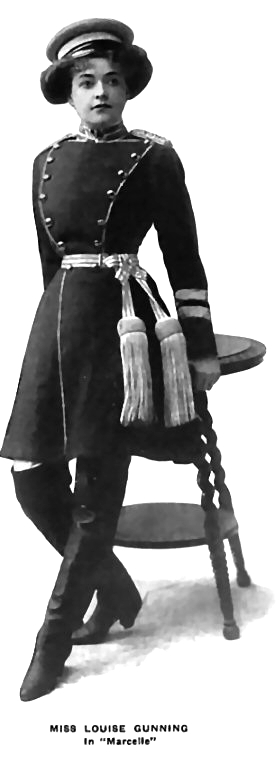
Louise Gunning as Marcelle, 1908

In February 1911, Gunning first played in The Balkan Princess as Princess Stephanie at the Herald Square Theatre, and then continued the run the following week at the Casino Theatre before embarking on a long tour later in the year. In May 1911, Gunning played Josephine in a two-month revival of H.M.S. Pinafore at the Casino Theatre and, at the Broadway Theatre in March 1913, she was Annabel Vandeveer in The American Maid, a short-lived comic opera by John Philip Sousa and Leonard Liebling. She joined the stock company at the Brooklyn Academy of Music in May 1914, to guest star as Mary in Forty-Five Minutes from Broadway. Reportedly Gunning was forced to cancel a European tour and return to America when in 1914 war threatened the continent. In 1915, she began a series of vaudeville singing engagements that would continue into the early 1920s.

== Personal life ==
In October 1903, Gunning married Frederick Pitney, owner of a New York cab company, and almost to the day two years later, gave birth to a baby girl, Louise Adelaide Pitney. The marriage ended sometime before the midpoint of the following decade. By 1915, Gunning had purchased a ranch in Sierra Madre, California, that she would maintain over the remainder of her life. On July 7, of that year she married the German-born concert violinist Oskar Seiling. A native of Munich, Seiling was born on July 7, 1880, a son of Jakob and Elizabeth (née Hehle) Seiling. He attended the Royal Academy of the Art of Music in Munich and the Ludwig-Maximilians-Universität München and was a student of Joseph Joachim in Berlin. Before coming to America at about the age of 26, Seiling had done considerable concert work in Germany and England.

In America Seiling performed in concerts and with chamber music groups before turning to teaching. He taught at Occidental College and, from 1907 to 1912, was head of the Violin Department at the University of Southern California and starting in 1913 held the same position for seven years at the University of Redlands. Seiling later taught privately at his music studio in Los Angeles and organized the Los Angeles Brahms Music Society. For a time Gunning and her husband were known for hosting outdoor music events at their Sierra Madre ranch that drew music lovers from all parts of the state.

Gunning died at the age of 81 on July 24, 1960, in Sierra Madre, California. She was preceded in death by her husband on December 7, 1958. Both are interred at the Sierra Madre Pioneer Cemetery.
