= The Prince of Pilsen =

The Prince of Pilsen is a musical in two acts with music and lyrics by Gustav Luders and a book by Frank S. Pixley.

== History ==
The Prince of Pilsen was produced by Henry W. Savage and was first performed on May 20, 1902 at the Tremont Theatre in Boston with Arthur Donaldson in the title role. Others in the original cast included John W. Ransone as Hans Wagner, Dorothy Morton as Mrs. Madison Crocker, Ruth Peebles as Nellie Wagner, Ivar Anderson as Lieutenant Tom Wagner, Maurice Darey as Lord Somerset, Robert O'Connor as Francois, A. L. Sutherland as the Cook's Courier, Zella Frank as Jimmy, Formosa Henderson as Edith Adams, Louise Montrose as Sidonie, and Ada Brown as Tiny.

The show was later staged on Broadway at the Broadway Theatre on 41st Street where it opened on 17 March 1903. It ran for a total of 147 performances at that theatre; closing on July 18, 1903. Arthur Donaldson and John W. Ransone were still in the same roles from the Boston cast. Others in the Broadway cast included Helen Bertram as Mrs. Madison Crocker, Albert Parr as Lieutenant Tom Wagner, Lillian Coleman as Nellie Wagner, Edgar Norton as Lord Somerset, Sherman Wade as Francois, J. L. Sutherland as Cook's Courier and Sergeant Brie, Eva Westcott as Jimmy, Anna Lichter as Edith Adams, Jeannette Bageard as Sidonie, Clyde L. McKinley as Rudolph, Linford R. Jefferson as Heinrich, John H. Pratt as Fritz, Francis Stuart as Ludwig, and Henry Taylor as Adolph.

The Prince of Pilsen was popular and was revived five times on Broadway between 1904 and 1930. It was also adapted in the silent film The Prince of Pilsen (1926). A film parody by Mack Sennett titled The Prince of Pilsener was released the same year.

In London West End the musical opened in July 1904 at the Shaftesbury Theatre with Sophie Brandt as the widow Mrs. Crocker.
