= Gertrude Bryan =

American actress (1888–1976)

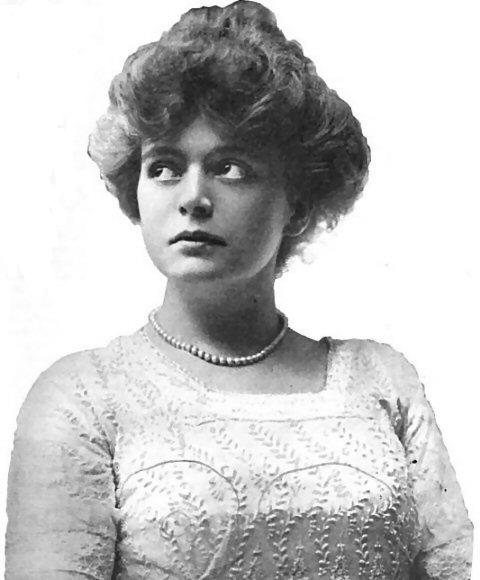
- National Magazine, Volume 37; March, 1913
- Born: Gertrude Modora Bryan; July 22, 1888; Chicago, Illinois, U.S.
- Died: May 24, 1976 (aged 87); Ossining, New York, U.S.
- Occupation: Actress
- Spouses: Harry Burgess, Charles Maitland Fair, John W. Garrett, Mr. Knapp
- Children: Charles Maitland Fair, Jr.

Gertrude Bryan (July 22, 1888 – May 24, 1976) was an American stage actress who appeared on Broadway in the early 20th century.

== Early life ==
Gertrude Modora Bryan was born in Chicago the daughter of entertainers. Bryan's father, Frank, a comedian known as Senator Bryan in The Military Man, later toured in a vaudeville act called “Human Flags” by Frank D. Bryan's Peace Congress of American Girls. Her mother, Nellie, was a singer in Gilbert & Sullivan operas. Bryan attended the Friends Seminary, a Quaker school, in Manhattan (New York).

== Stage actress ==
Bryan appeared in Little Boy Blue at the Lyric Theatre (New York) in November 1911. This was a romantic operetta which had played Europe in the two previous theatrical seasons. The musical was produced by Colonel Savage. Its title in Europe had been Lord Piccolo. The American title had no connection to the popular nursery rhyme of the same name.

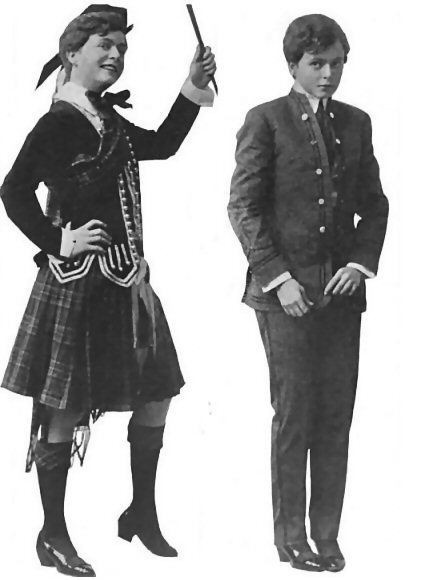
Bryan as Little Boy Blue

Bryan played the title role. The plot is about a Scottish Earl who is looking for an heir. The Earl employees a detective who persuades a barmaid to disguise herself as the missing boy, and accompany the Earl to Scotland. The operetta was performed in two acts. There were dual settings in Bal Tarabin, Paris, France and the Earl's castle in Scotland. Nearly a dozen applicants were auditioned before Bryan was chosen for the title role.

Bryan was just past 18 when she performed this role. On opening night of Little Boy Blue she was suffering from a strained ligament in her foot. A doctor came to her dressing room and bandaged her leg in a manner that caused her pain throughout the performance. Bryan was self-conscious that the excess amount of bandage used would be conspicuous to the audience.

The character of Little Boy Blue was her own creation. Her manager boasted that she found the correct pantomime at the right time without requiring stage direction. By late April the musical moved to the West End Theater, 263 West 86th Street. A reviewer for the Syracuse Herald was at the Wieting Theater in Syracuse for a November show. He observed Bryan as the barmaid. He wrote that she possesses a charming personality and although her voice is somewhat light she sings with dainty grace and shines most conspicuously as an actress.

She had been on the stage for only two years. Her previous experience as an actress consisted of a role in a musical comedy entitled The Wife Tamers and depicting the part of Sonia in Merry Widow. In the latter she was associated with a Henry Wilson Savage troupe. Bryan went to Europe after the season's final show of Little Boy Blue in May 1912. The cast made a run of the eastern cities of the United States starting in August.

Bryan returned to acting in 1924 in a vaudeville musical comedy produced by Guy Bolton and P.G. Wodehouse. Sitting Pretty premiered in Detroit, Michigan, on March 23. The cast included Queenie Smith, Jayne Chesney, and Rudolph Cameron. Bryan portrayed May Tolliver. In April the two-act play moved to the Fulton Theatre, 1368 Fulton Street (Brooklyn). In June she was the leading lady in a comedy by John V.A. Weaver entitled Love 'Em and Leave 'Em.

Bryan continued to perform through 1939. She was among the supporting cast of Skylark which opened at the Morosco Theatre in October. Gertrude Lawrence starred in this Broadway presentation which was adapted from a novel and serialized in a magazine under a different title.

== Personal ==
In 1911 she married Harry Burgess, a singer in the Merry Widow. The following year the couple decided to divorce. Bryan married next a New York stockbroker, Charles Maitland Fair, at the home of her mother in Red Bank, New Jersey, in October 1913. Fair was the son of Robert Fair, retired managing director of Marshall Field's, and a cousin of Virginia Fair, wife of William Kissam Vanderbilt II. Their son was the author (“From the Jaws of Victory”; 1971) Charles M. Fair, Jr.

Bryan retired from the stage when she became engaged to Fair. She enjoyed the outdoors, especially walking, horse riding, and fishing. She confessed to being a tomboy, having worn trousers and long boots on fishing trips with her father in her youth. Bryan and Fair divorced on June 2, 1930, at The Hague, Netherlands, and on June 16 in London she married John W. Garrett, 2nd, a New York investment banker.

In 1945 Bryan published the book “Count that Day”; its copyright was recorded under the name Gertrude Bryan Knapp.

Bryan died on May 24, 1976, in Ossining, New York.
