= Gustav Luders =

Operatic composer

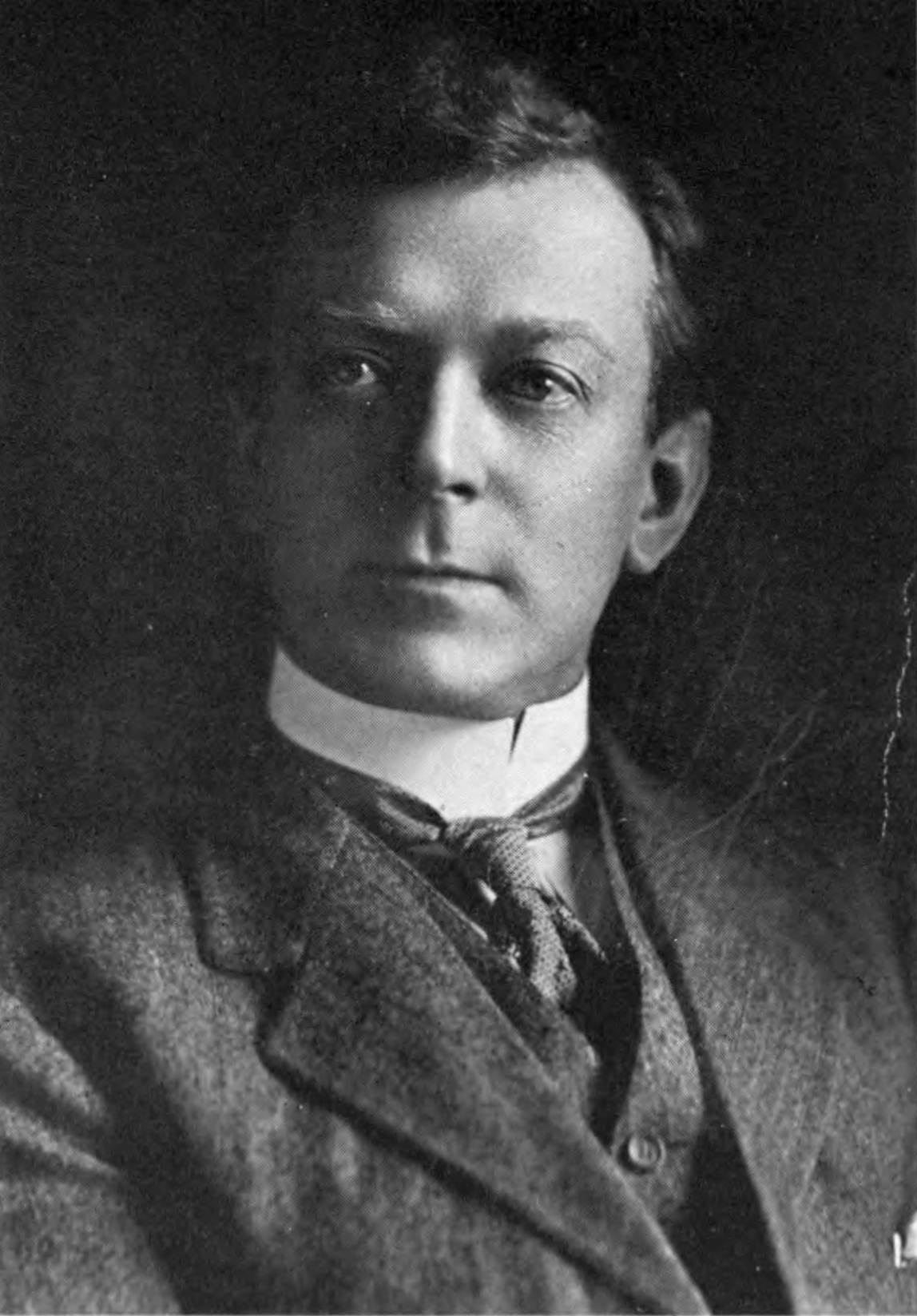
Luders

Gustave Luders (December 13, 1865 – January 24, 1913) was a German-born American composer, music arranger, and conductor. He is best known as a composer of operettas and musical comedies; many of the which were first staged in Chicago prior to being staged on Broadway. His style of writing was heavily influenced by both Arthur Sullivan and Viennese operetta.

== Life and career ==
Gustave Carl Luders was born on December 13, 1865 in Bremen, Germany. He trained as a musician in Germany. In 1888 he immigrated to the United States where he settled in Milwaukee, Wisconsin. There he worked as an orchestra conductor and the director of a light opera company.

In 1889 Luders began working for M. Witmark & Sons as a music arranger. Soon after he relocated to Chicago where he worked in various theaters as a pit orchestra conductor. He began writing operettas and music comedies with the librettist Frank S. Pixley who was his most frequent collaborator. Their most successful work was The Prince of Pilsen. It was adapted into the film The Prince of Pilsen. It was staged many times both in the United States and abroad into the 1950s. His other successful works included The Burgomaster (1900), Woodland (1904) and The Sho-Gun (1904).

Luders also teamed with the writer George Ade. The Lester S. Levy Sheet Music Collection at Johns Hopkins has several of his works.

Gustave Luders died in New York City on January 24, 1913.

== Work ==
- The Burgomaster with Frank Pixley
- By the Sad Sea Waves (musical)
- "King Dodo" (1901) with Frank Pixley
- The Prince of Pilsen (1902)
- Woodland (1904)
- The Sho-Gun (1904), with George Ade
  - "Korean Dance" (1904)
    - "Hi-Ko, Hi-Ko" (1904)
- The Grand Mogul (1906)
- Marcelle (1908)
- The Gypsy (1912)
- Somewhere Else (1913)
- Mam'selle Napoleon
- The Prince of Pilsen
- The Fair Co-ed
- The old town: A musical farce in two acts
