= Henry Wilson Savage =

American theatrical manager (1859–1927)

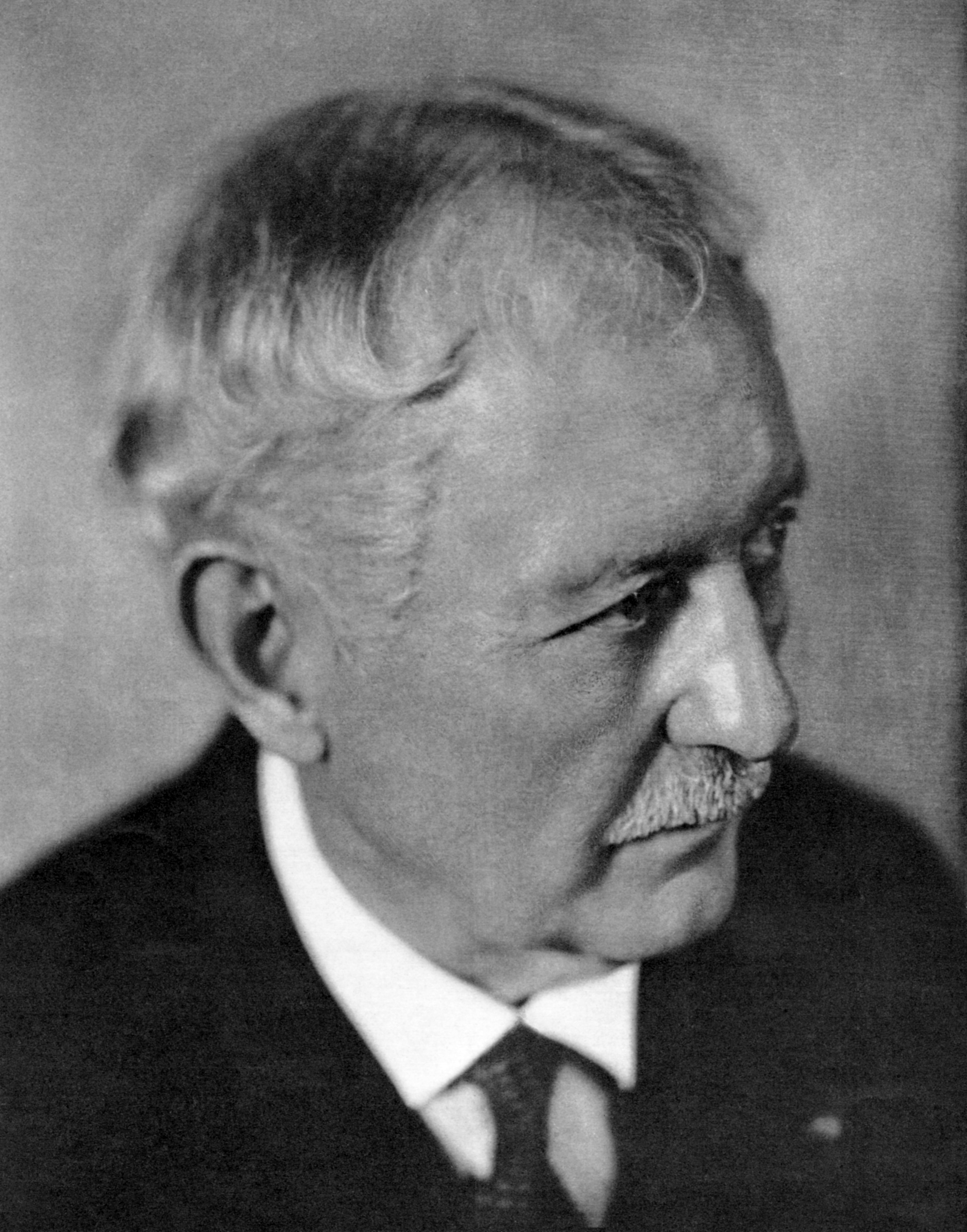
- Henry W. Savage in 1925
- Born: March 21, 1859; New Durham, New Hampshire
- Died: November 29, 1927 (aged 68); Boston, Massachusetts
- Occupation: Theatrical Manager
- Years active: 1900 - 1925
- Known for: The Merry Widow; The Prince of Pilsen; The Girl of the Golden West; The College Widow; The Country Chairman
- Spouse: Alice Louise Batcheler (m. 1889; death 1927)
- Children: Two, John and Bettina

Henry Wilson Savage (March 21, 1859 – November 29, 1927) was an American theatrical manager and real estate entrepreneur.

== Biography ==
Henry Wilson Savage was born in New Durham, New Hampshire, on March 21, 1859. He earned his degree from Harvard in 1880. In 1895, he was recognized as a wealthy real estate investor in Boston before he got involved with the theater. His initial foray into the theatrical field was in 1900.

Savage was the first pioneer in performing Grand opera in English. He lavishly staged these productions, making each performance a grand spectacle for the viewer. Savage staged some of the most popular musical shows of the early 1900s, earning a second fortune. Before he stepped away from production in 1925, he was acknowledged with over 50 stage successes.

He was the president of the Henry W. Savage Company, Inc., Castle Square Opera Company of Boston, and the Director of the National Association of Theatrical Producing Managers of America.

== Productions ==
Savage's more notable productions include the following:

- The Sho-Gun
- The Prince of Pilsen
- The Girl of the Golden West
- The Merry Widow
- The College Widow
- The County Chairman
- The Chocolate Soldier
- Madama Butterfly (the first American performance in 1906)
- Little Boy Blue (1912)
- Somewhere Else (1913)
- Toot-Toot (1917) – featuring "The Last Long Mile"
- Everywoman (1913–14)
- Mr. Wu (1914)
- Lass O'Laughter starring Flora Le Breton in 1925, Savage's last production in New York

== Death ==
Savage died in Boston on November 29, 1927. In the 1953 memoir Bring On the Girls! (by P. G. Wodehouse and Guy Bolton), he is depicted as an "extraordinarily manipulative and money-grubbing entrepreneur."

Henry W. Savage produced musicals

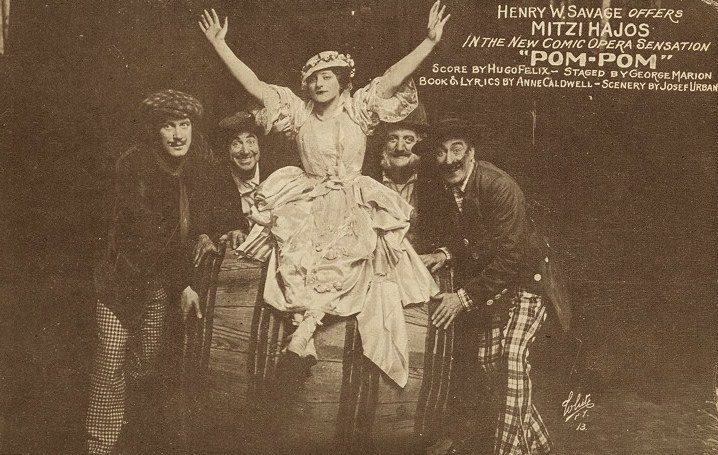
Pom-Pom starring Mitzi Hajos 1916

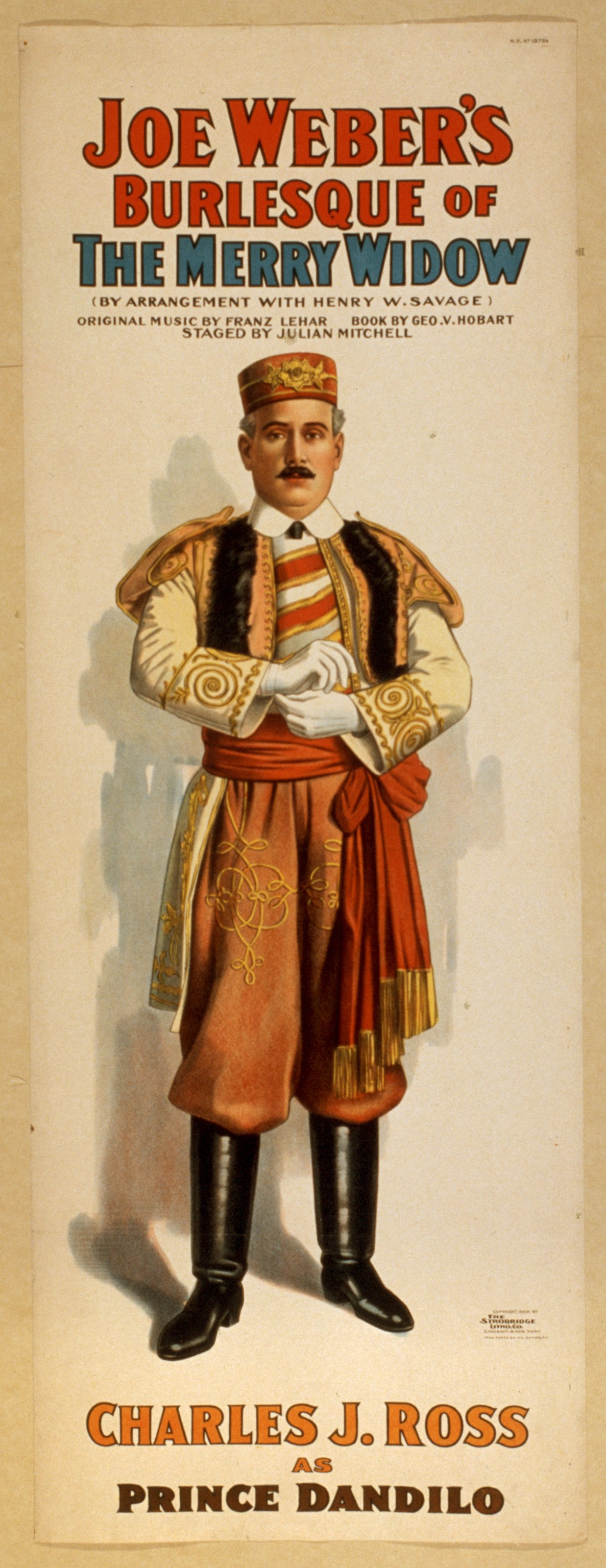
"The Merry Widow" 1908

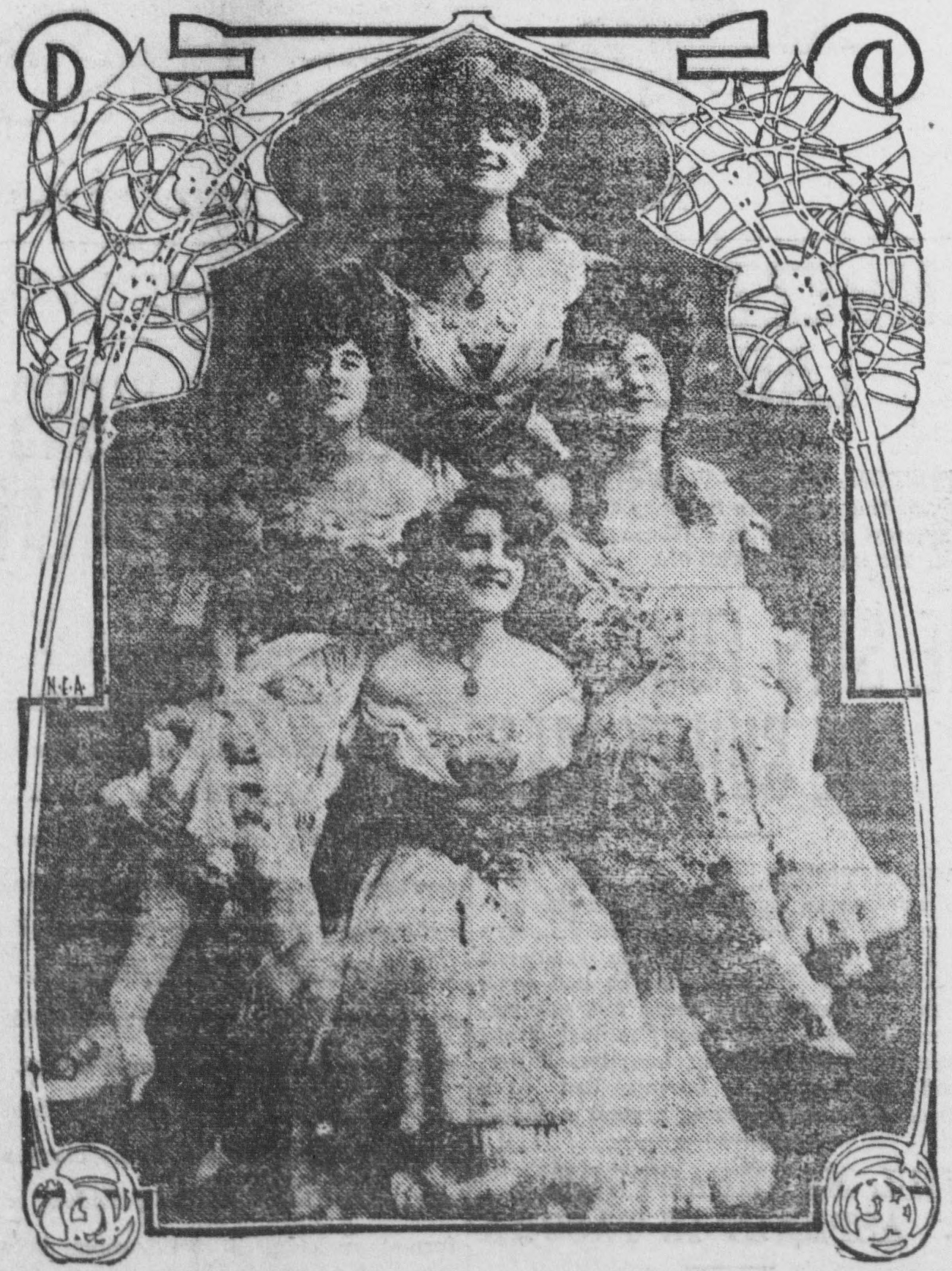
"Peggy from Paris" showgirls 1904.

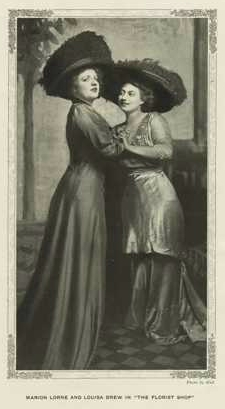
"The Florist Shop" Marion Lorne and Louise Drew 1909

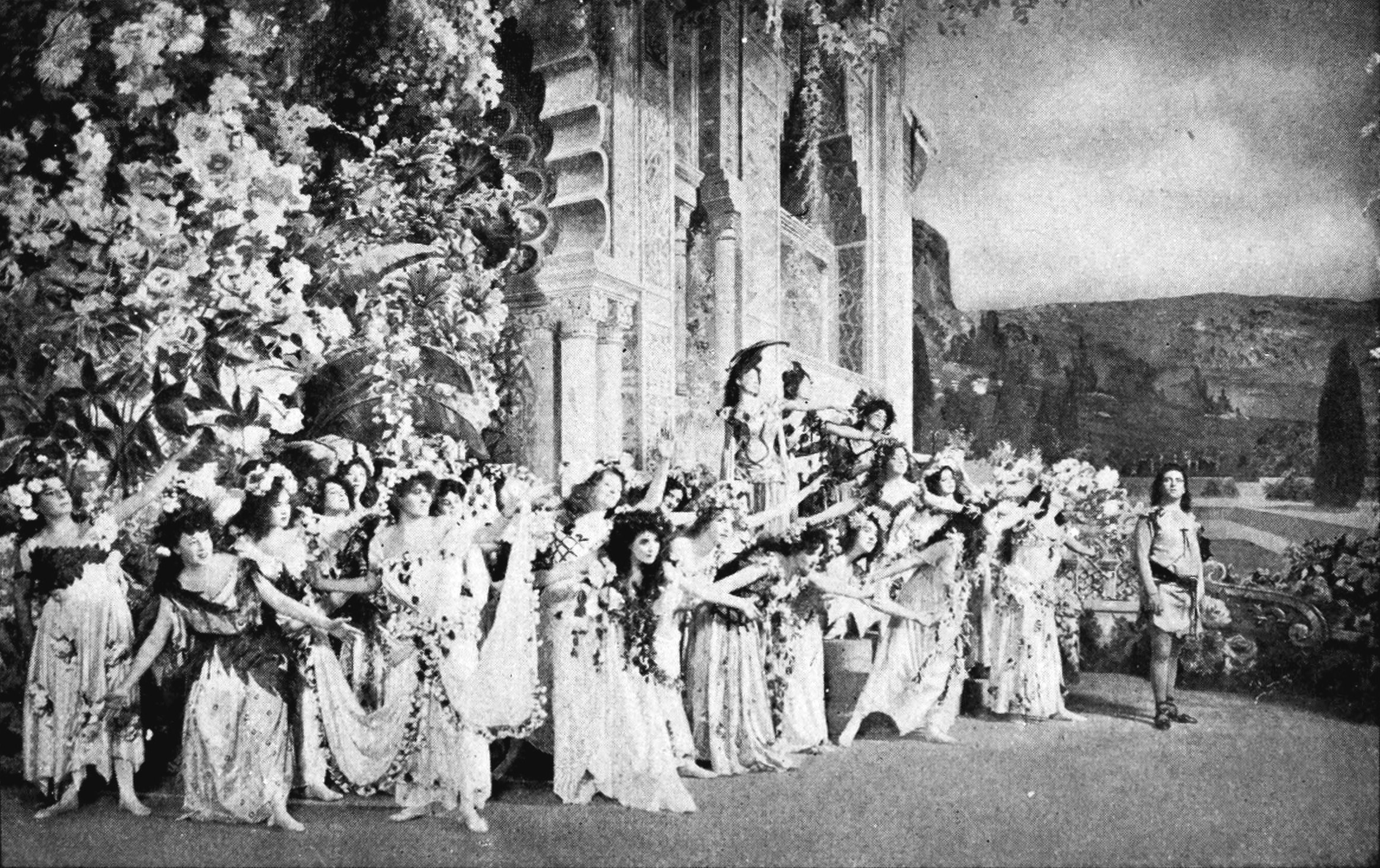
Wagner's "Parsifal" Flower Maidens 1917
