= Körting =

Körting is a surname. Notable people with the name include:

- Georg Körting (1844–1919), German Chief Surgeon General of the Guards Corps in the First World War
- Gustav Körting (1845–1913), German philologist
- Heinrich Körting (1859–1890), German philologist
- Otto Körting (1884–1959), German politician
- Sophie Körting (Fia Wille) (1868–1920), German designer and interior architect

== See also ==
- Körting Hannover, industrial engineering company in Hanover, Germany
