= Kordt =

Kordt is a German surname. Notable people with the surname include:

- Carolin Kordt (born 1984), German handball player
- Erich Kordt (1903–1969), German ambassador
- Pierre-Emile Kordt Hojbjerg (born 1995), Danish professional footballer
- Theodor Kordt (1893–1962), German diplomat
- Walter Kordt (1899–1972), German theatre director and writer

== See also ==
- Kord
- Kort
- Cort
- Cord
