= Kort =

Kort or KORT may refer to:

== People ==
Given name

- Kort Rogge (c. 1425-1501) a Swedish bishop and member of the Privy Council of Sweden
- Kort Schubert (born 1979), American rugby union footballer

Surname: Kort

- Dawid Kort (born 1995), Polish footballer
- Ellen Kort, American poet
- Joe Kort (born 1963), American psychotherapist, clinical social worker, clinical sexologist, author, lecturer
- Ludwig Kort, German fluid dynamicist known for developing the ducted propeller, or Kort nozzle
- Michael Kort (born 1944), American historian, academic, and author
- Milton Kort (1917–2003), American pharmacist, hobbyist magician

Surname: Korts

- Berthold Korts (1912–1943), World War II Luftwaffe fighter ace

Surname: de Kort

- Bram de Kort (born 1991), Dutch racing cyclist
- Gérard de Kort (born 1963), Dutch butterfly swimmer
- Hein de Kort (born 1956), Dutch cartoonist
- Kees de Kort (1934–2022), Dutch artist best known for his illustrations of Bible scenes for children's books
- Koen de Kort (born 1982), Dutch cyclist
- Michael DeKort, American engineering project manager at Lockheed Martin, whistleblower

== Media ==
- KORT (AM), a radio station (1230 AM) licensed to Grangeville, Idaho, U.S.
- KORT-FM, a radio station (92.7 FM) licensed to Grangeville, Idaho, U.S.

== Others ==
- Franska Kort, 1976 album of Swedish singer/songwriter Ted Gärdestad
- Kort Grocery, also known as Camp Springs Grocery, a historic property located on Four Mile Road in Camp Springs, Kentucky
- Kort nozzle or ducted propeller, an assembly for marine propulsion
- Kört-Aika Monument, a steel statue located at the entrance to the village of Kortkeros, Kortkerossky District, Komi Republic, Russia
- T:kort, a digital ticket used for travel with public transport in Trøndelag, Norway
- Kort, an Indonesian music magazine

== See also ==
- Körting
- Korte (disambiguation)
- Cort (disambiguation)
