= Grand Opera House (Seattle) =

Former theater in Seattle, Washington

Coordinates: 47.6031°N 122.3323°W

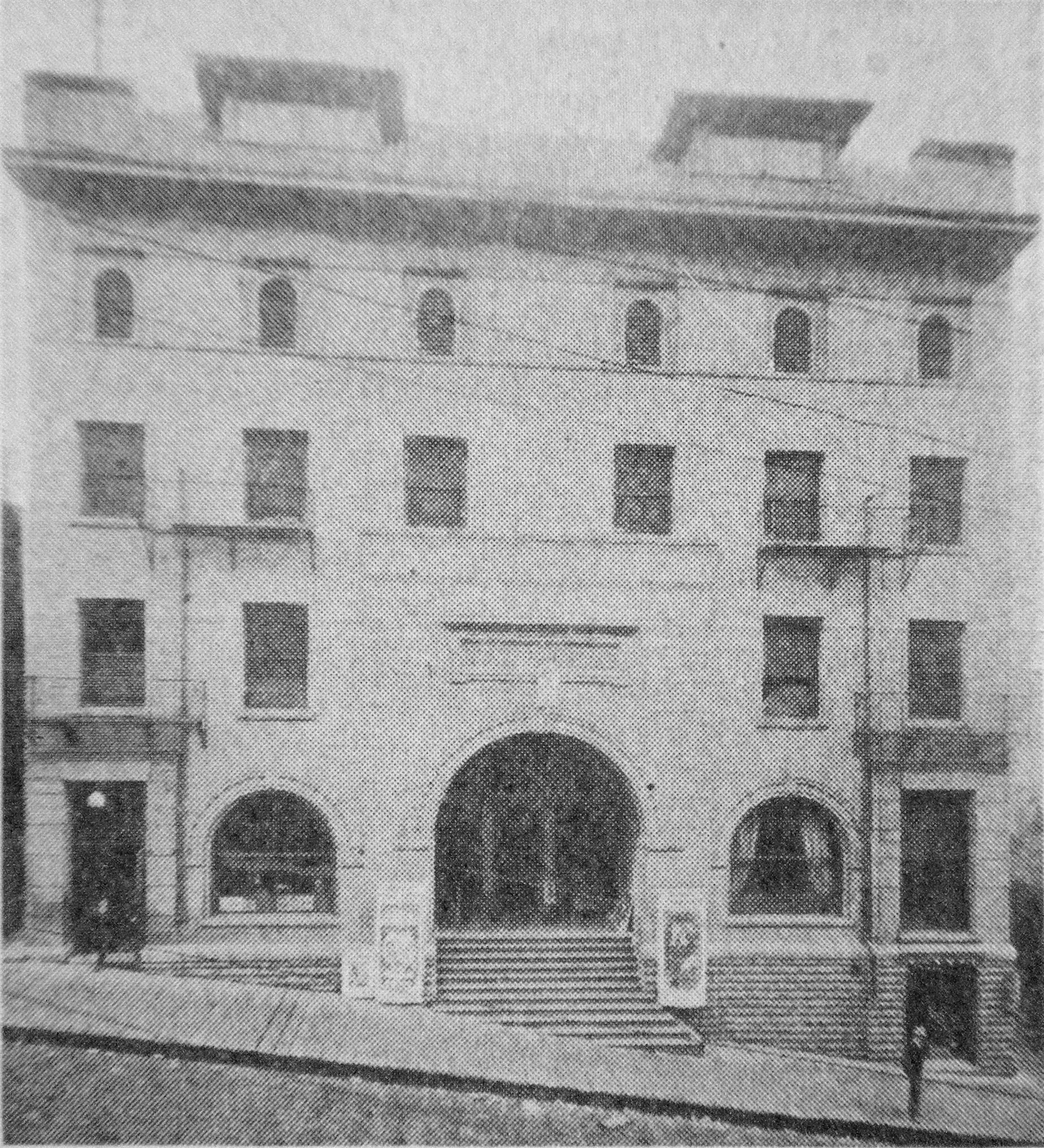
Seattle's Grand Opera House in 1905.

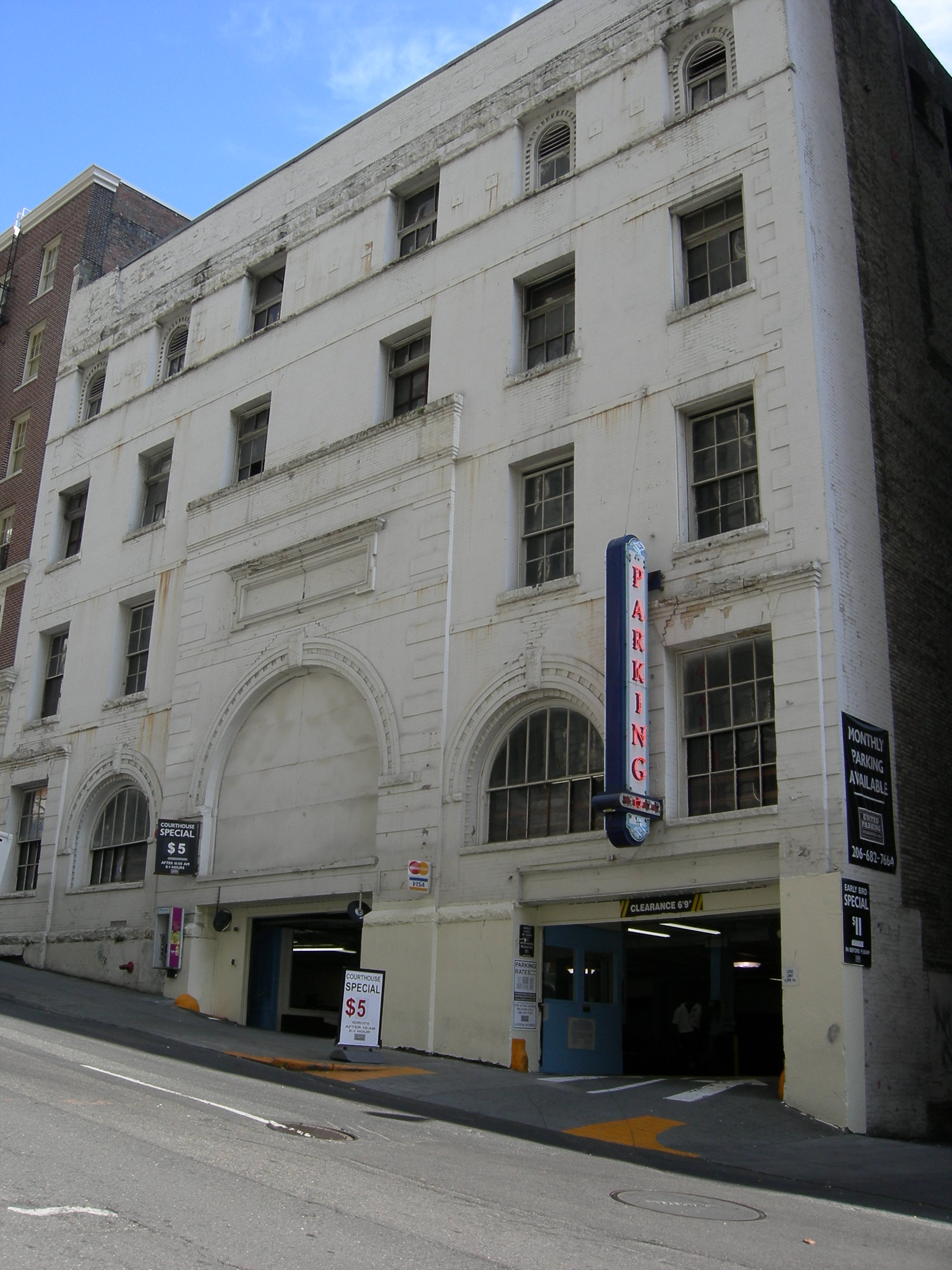
Today the building (seen here in 2007) is a parking garage.

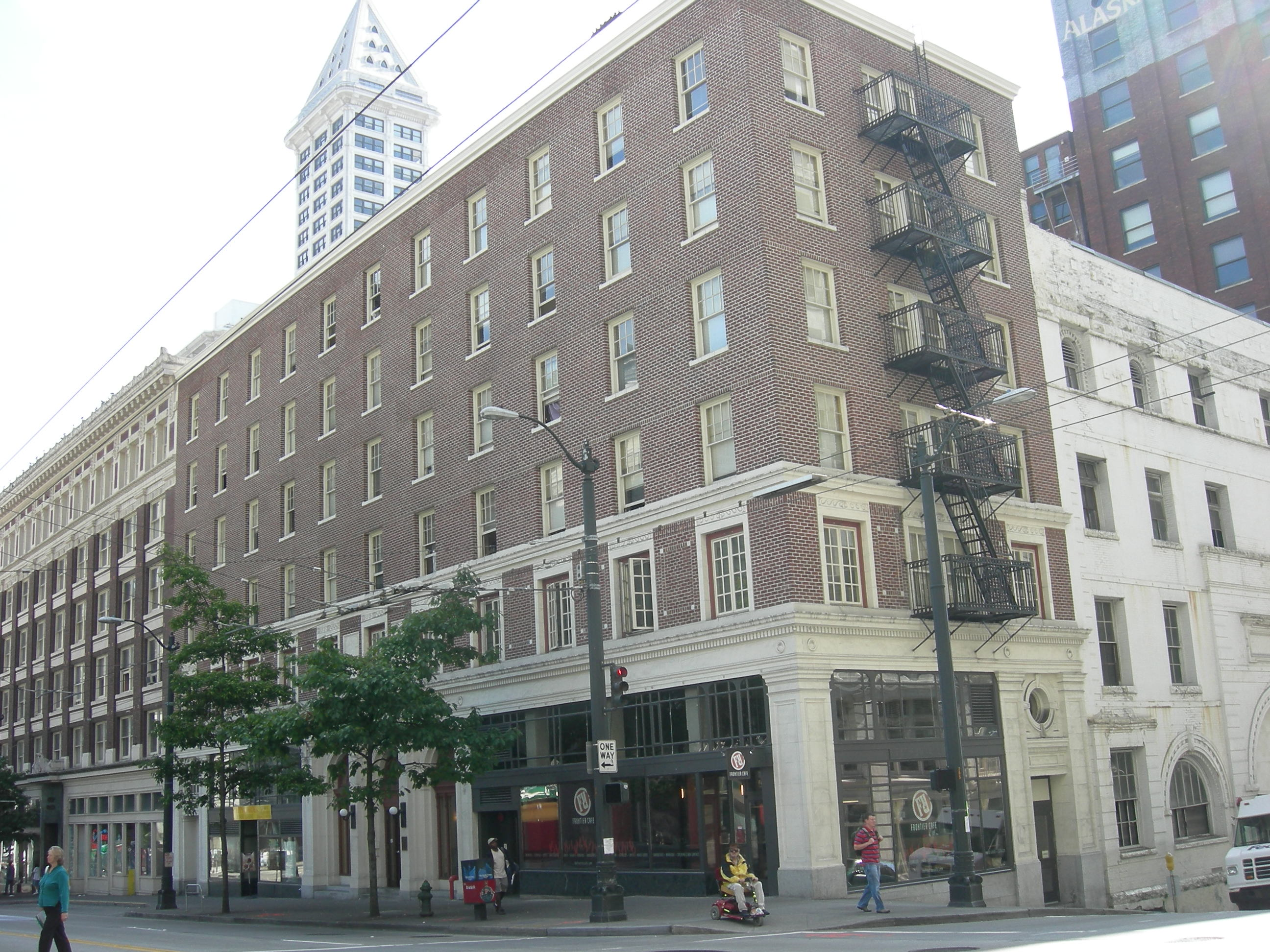
The St. Charles / Rector Hotel Building (seen here in 2007) front and center; a portion of the former Grand Opera House at right.

The Grand Opera House in Seattle, Washington, US, designed by Seattle architect Edwin W. Houghton, a leading designer of Pacific Northwest theaters, was once the city's leading theater. Today, only its exterior survives as the shell of a parking garage. Considered by the city's Department of Neighborhoods to be an example of Richardsonian Romanesque, the building stands just outside the northern boundary of the Pioneer Square neighborhood.

The building at 213–217 Cherry Street, Seattle, Washington was originally owned by John Cort, of Cort Circuit fame. Opened in 1900, after Cort convinced the city to extend the northern border of its official entertainment district north from Yesler Way to Cherry Street, it was the city's leading theater of the time. It survived a November 24, 1906 fire, but after it was gutted by another fire in 1917, it was converted to a parking garage in 1923.

The reign of the Grand as Seattle's leading theater was relatively short. Cort himself was one of the reasons for this, when he made Seattle's Moore Theatre, also designed by Houghton, his flagship house after its December 28, 1907 opening. The 1911 opening of the showpiece Metropolitan Theatre in the Metropolitan Tract further eroded the Grand's position. By the time a January 20, 1917 fire gutted the building, it had become a movie theater.

After the 1917 fire, the building sat empty for several years before becoming a multi-level parking garage in 1923.

== Theater ==
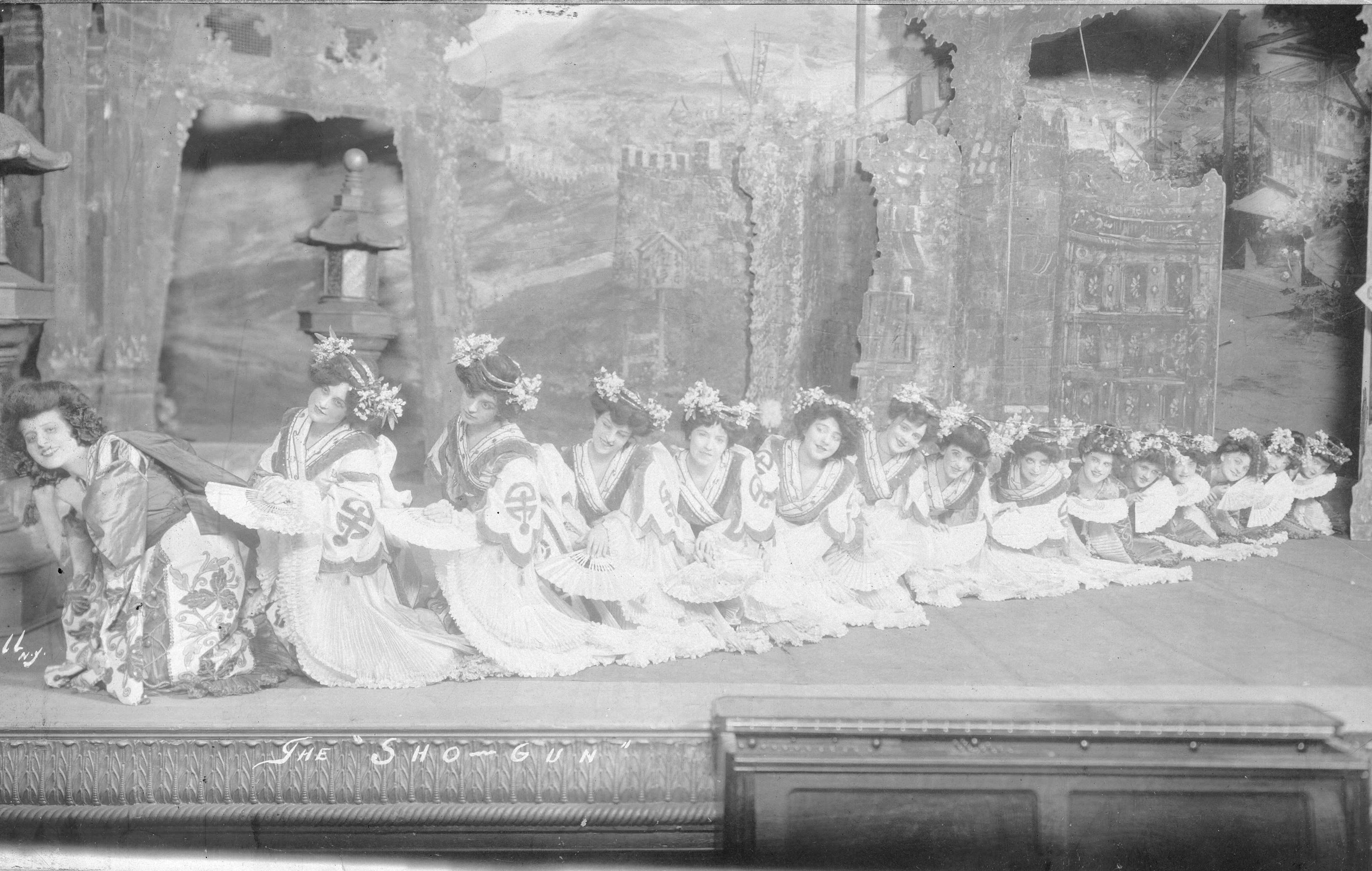
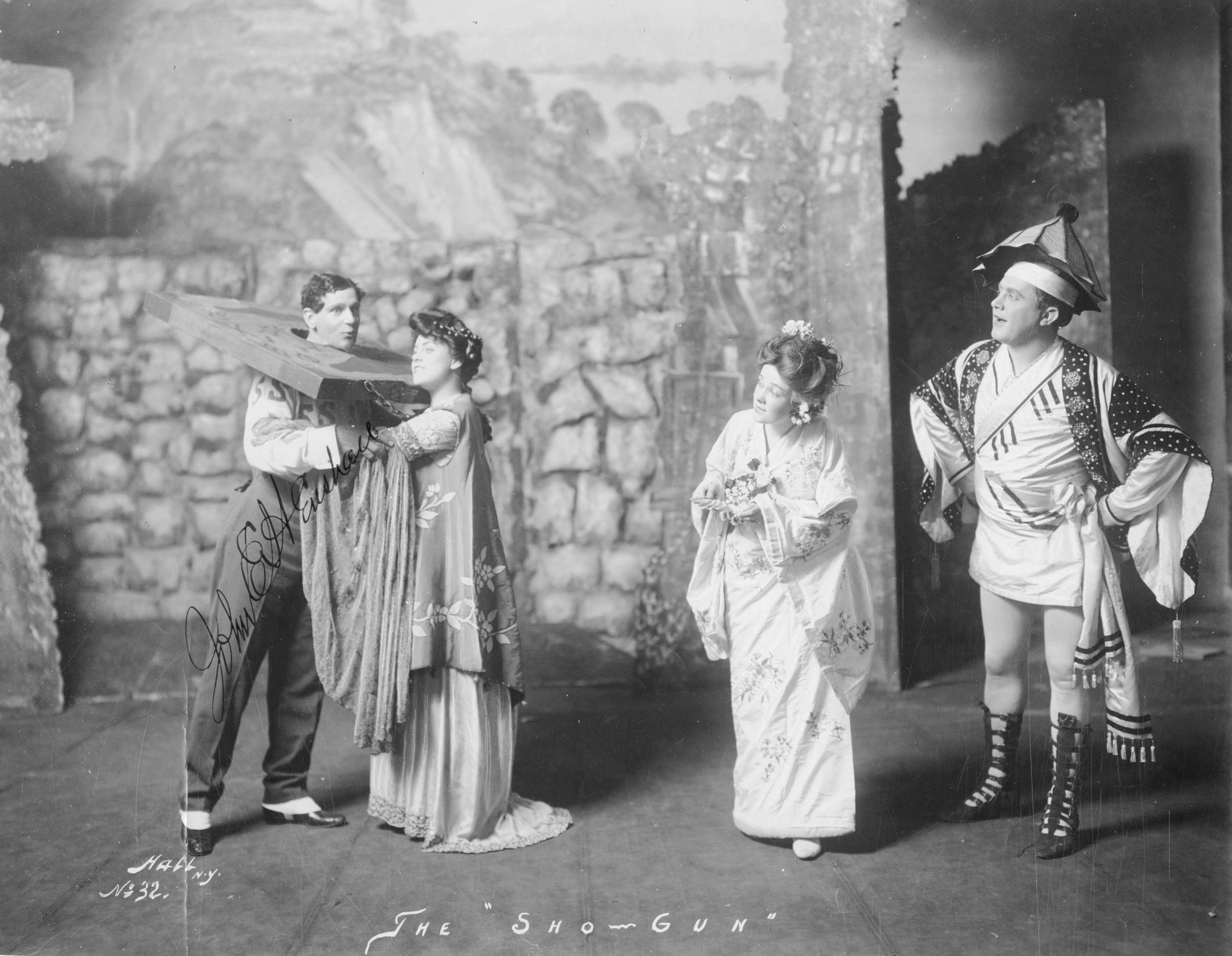
Gustav Luders and George Ade's The Sho-Gun being performed at Seattle's Grand Opera House in December 1905.

The Grand Opera House was constructed from 1898 to 1900. Nearby at Third Avenue and Cherry Street, John Considine, a veteran of box house days and a pioneer of vaudeville had his highly successful Seattle Theater. Cort had the basement level of the Grand built in 1898 and opened it as a variety and beer hall known as the Palm Gardens. In the summer of 1900, the rest of the building was built "in record time," with its official opening on October 8, 1900.

In the winter of 1901, Cort signed a contract with New York-based impresarios Klaw & Erlanger. The contract went into effect in July 1901, quickly establishing the Grand as Seattle's leading theater and forcing the nearby Seattle Theater into second place. Within a year, Cort had taken over the Seattle Theater as well, placing both theaters in the Klaw & Erlanger circuit.

In December 1905, The Sho-Gun was performed at the theater.

A fire on November 23, 1906, destroyed the interior and led Cort to briefly make the Seattle Theater his flagship; in December 1907, Cort's new Moore Theatre opened and eclipsed the Grand once and for all. That time, Eugene Levy took over the Grand and ran it as a movie theater with "incidental" vaudeville.

The stage of the Grand was 30 feet (9.1 m) and 72 feet (21.9 m) wide. Two tiers of boxes stood six on each side of the proscenium. There was also a balcony. In all, the highly ornate auditorium had a capacity of 2,200 people. The St. Charles/Rector Hotel was constructed next door on Third Avenue in 1912–13; it was originally interconnected to the opera house at the balcony level.

Although the Grand was the twenty-second playhouse in Seattle's history and it was a mere 17 years old when it burned, by that time it was the oldest Seattle playhouse still in use.

== The fire ==
The theater caught fire early on the morning of Saturday, January 20, 1917, due to defective wiring under the floor of the balcony. Janitor George Matsu turned in the alarm at 6:13 a.m., bringing the fire department. The flames endangered the Rector Hotel, and the guests were evacuated. At about 7 a.m., the domed theater roof caved in, killing fire department Battalion Chief Frederick G. Gilham and seriously injuring nine other firefighters, five of them seriously. By 8 a.m. their colleagues had managed to evacuate the injured men and extinguish the blaze. One hotel guest suffered from smoke inhalation; otherwise, there were no civilian casualties.

Less than two weeks later, an article in The Seattle Daily Times hinted that then-recent Seattle mayor George F. Cotterill may have fired R.H. Ober as Superintendent of Buildings because of the latter's safety-related rejection of permits for the Grand. (There was a long-running feud between the Times and Cotterill, in which the newspaper "consistently ridiculed Cotterill and his positions.") Levy had boasted in an advertisement about having a role in getting Ober removed, and other city officials may have felt intimidated by that; on the other hand, Fire Chief Frank L. Stetson asserted that the Grand had appeared no more dangerous than "other buildings of its type" and that the changes to the building that Ober had wanted had, indeed, ultimately occurred. The city council committee investigating the matter did not ultimately conclude that either Levy or Cotterill had done anything wrong.

== Parking garage ==
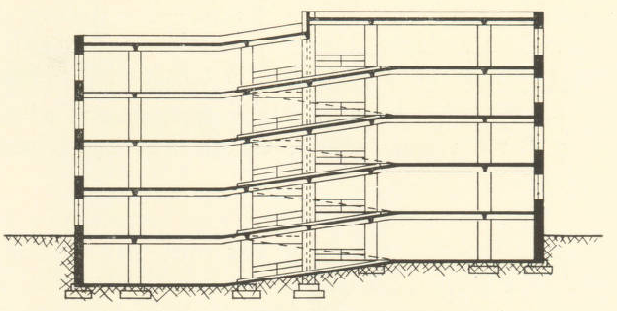
This circa 1929 schematic cross-section shows a d'Humy Motoramp.

In 1923, new owners Victor Elfendal and W.W. Scrubby decided that the Grand would be converted to use as a parking garage. Schack, Young and Myers, a major Seattle architectural firm, affected the conversion. The Seattle Department of Neighborhoods asserts that this relatively intact and early example of a commercial parking garage has historic significance, independent of the building's historic significance as Downtown Seattle's oldest surviving structure initially designed as a theater. As Seattle's commercial core began to grow and as the automobile began to shape the city, "large parking garages…were a lucrative and essential part of downtown commerce."

Construction began March 24, 1923 on a parking garage described at the time as "the first of its kind in the Northwest" with "[p]atented ramps". At that time it was described as $30,000 "five-story and basement" project with a capacity of 300 cars; a day before it opened on August 20, it was described as a seven-story building (6 floors and a basement) with a capacity of 350 cars, and having cost twice the original estimate. It was further described as having "heavy mill-type construction" with 6-inch (15 cm) concrete floors, using the patented d'Humy Motoramp. The garage also included a full-service auto servicing shop. The resulting Cherry Street Garage became the third garage in the portfolio of the Griggs Garage Company, making it the largest such company in Seattle at that time.

== The structure ==
The building is a 5-story brick masonry structure in Richardsonian Romanesque style, not counting a foundation and basement. It measures 77 feet (23.5 m) x 120 feet (36.6 m). The theater interior is entirely destroyed, and the façade is much altered, but some original exterior features remain under white paint. The original red brick cladding has been painted over, as have the ornamental quoins and the remaining portions of the original sandstone trim. According to the Department of Neighborhoods, surviving sandstone features include "the former entry vestibule arch, the arched openings with keystones at the second floor level windows, the upper floor level window sills and watertable. Painted original sandstone trim also accentuates the former name plaque above the entry vestibule arch and the cap of the central raised entry bay."

The building retains all of its original window openings. The two large openings at the first floor level date from the parking garage conversion. At the east end of the second floor, a former door opening to the ticket booth became a window opening: creating the garage entry and exit meant removing the entry stairway, which (according, again, to the Department of Neighborhoods) "reportedly was accented by Vermont blue marble." Originally, the garage retained raised corner parapets and a prominent cornice; these have been lost. The industrial steel sash windows from 1923 remain.
