= G. O. Guy =

Drugstore chain in Seattle, Washington

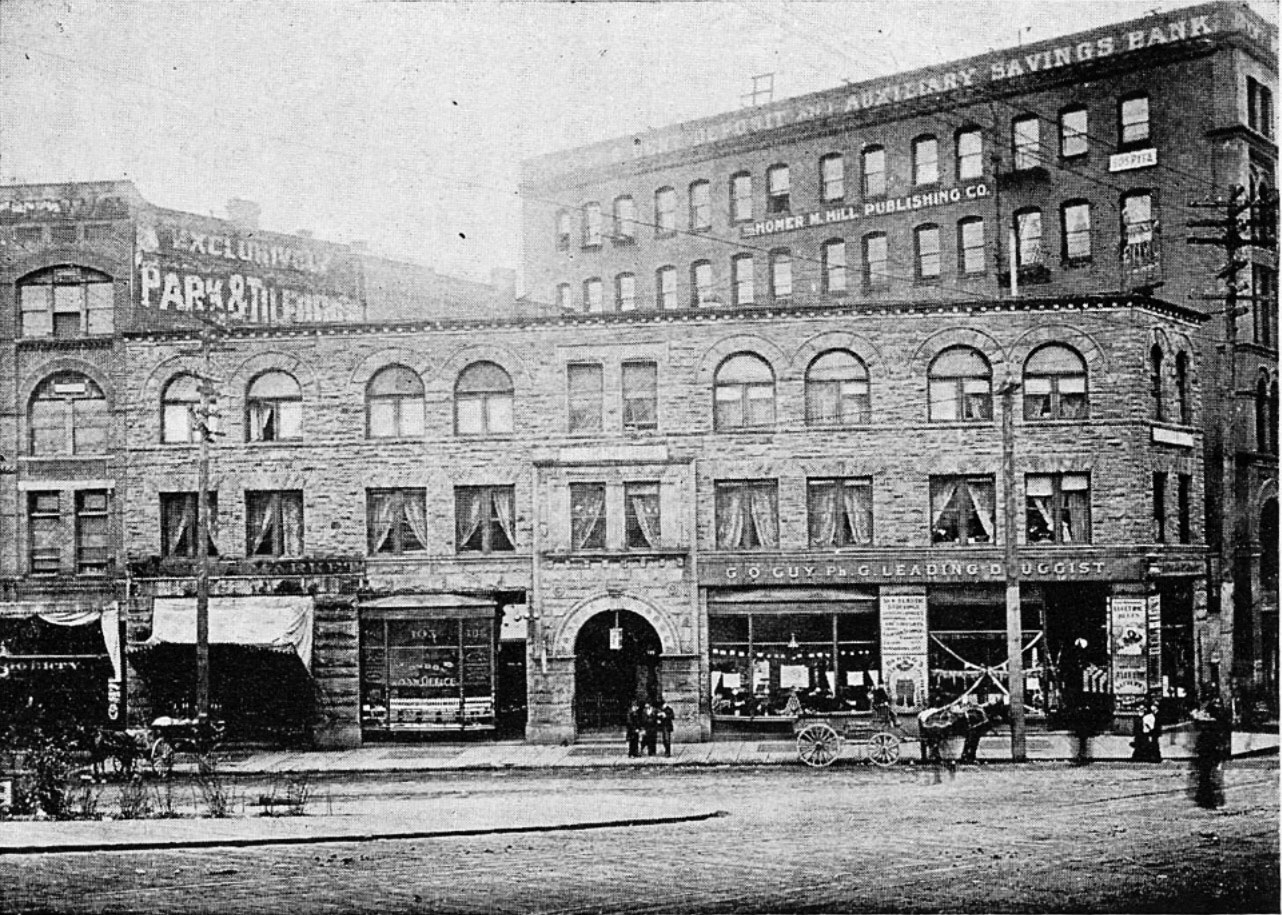
The G. O. Guy store in the Metropole Building at Second Avenue and Yesler Way in Seattle (photographed in 1900). The sign over the store says "G.O. Guy Ph. G. Leading Druggist."

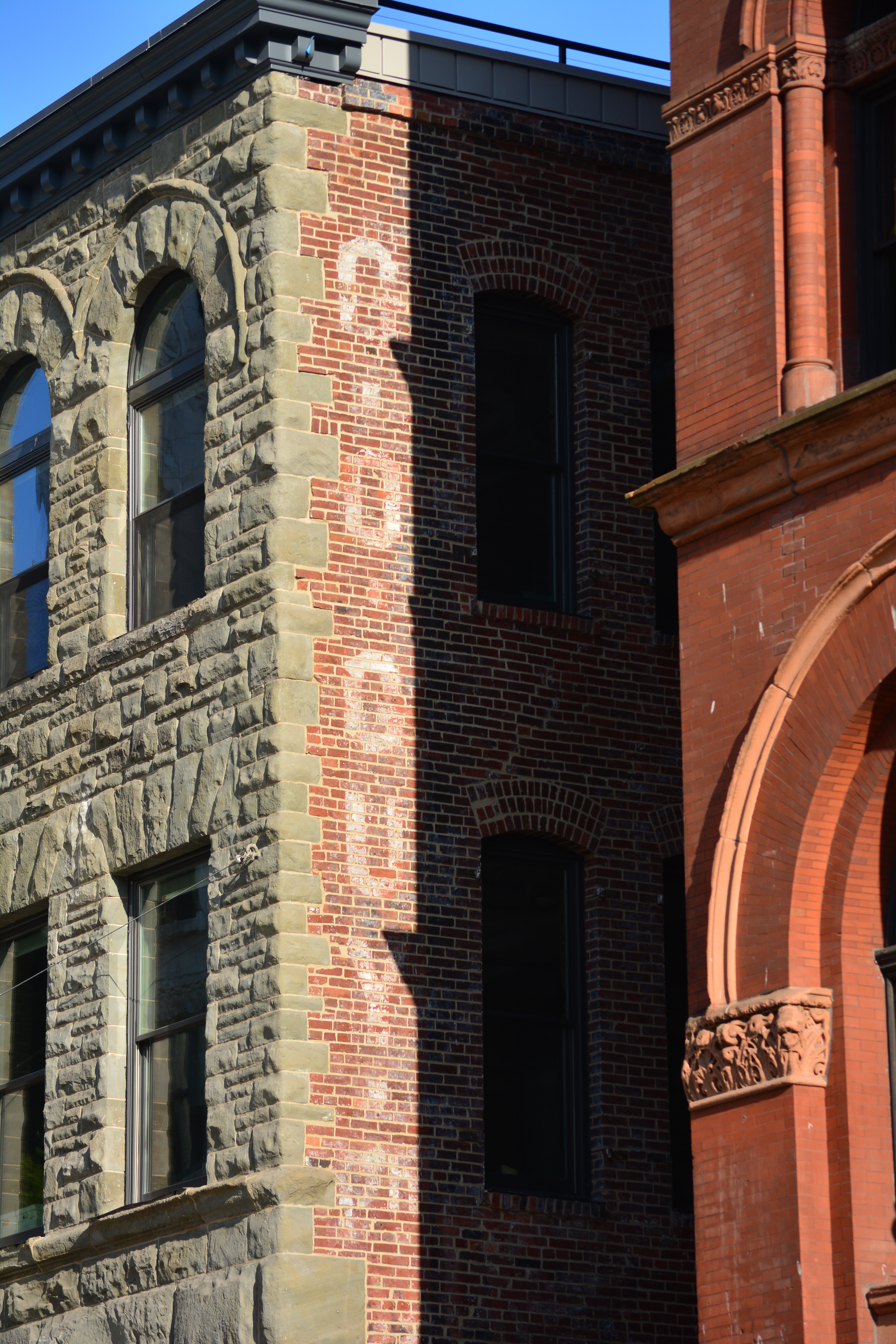
As of 2025, a ghost sign for G.O. Guy remains on the Metropole Building.

G.O. Guy was a small chain of drugstores located in the Seattle area of the U.S. state of Washington. The chain was founded in 1888 by George Omar Guy. Throughout the early 20th century, G.O. Guy's was the second largest drug store chain in Seattle behind Bartell Drugs and predated it by two years. In 1987 Pay 'n Save purchased all six locations and converted most of them to Pay 'n Save express stores, slightly smaller than full service stores. Pay 'n Save was bought by Thrifty PayLess which in turn was bought by Rite Aid.

== Original location ==
Many modern sources give the location of the first store as the H. K. Owens / Metropole Building at Second Avenue and Yesler Way, however contemporary sources indicate that Guy's first store was actually located about two blocks south, at Occidental Avenue and Main Street. For example, Guy's January 31, 1927, obituary in the Seattle Daily Times, reads:

Mr. Guy started his drug business at the corner of Occidental Avenue and Main Street. After the great fire a year later [i.e. in 1889], which demolished his store, he resumed business in a tent at First Avenue and Main Street and in 1893 occupied, at Second Avenue and Yesler Way, the present site of the drug company.

A Times article from 1934 gives further details of the several years following the fire:

Guy's first thought was for the medicines, and he saved them to establish headquarters in a first-aid tent, where he stayed until a frame building was finished at Fourth Avenue and Main Street... Later he moved to First Avenue and Main Street and, in 1893, he moved to Second Avenue and Yesler Way. There the store still stands.

== Shootout at Second and Yesler ==
The G.O. Guy drugstore at the corner of Second Avenue and Yesler Way in Seattle was the site of an infamous shootout in 1901.

Seattle police chief William L. Meredith had been fired for corruption as part of a feud with "box house" owner John Considine. John Considine owned the People's Theater, a "box house," offering light entertainment "such as magic acts, singing, dancing, minstrel shows," but also providing sexual services. Their feud had led to Meredith's resignation under pressure.

Meredith, out of a job, came gunning for Considine. After Meredith got off a couple of wild shots, Considine's brother Tom Considine managed to grab a gun and use it as a club to fracture Meredith's skull; John Considine shot Meredith in the heart. The struggle lasted about 90 seconds altogether. The Considines were ultimately acquitted for the killing.

== Locations ==
Locations included, but not limited to:

- Second Avenue and Yesler Way
- 725 3rd Avenue, also described as the corner of 3rd Avenue and Columbia
- 1401 3rd Avenue in the Mann Building also described as the corner of 3rd Avenue and Union, opposite the post office
- 406 Broadway East, also described as corner Broadway and Harrison and as 406 North Broadway
- 4501 University Way
- 4700 California Avenue SW
- 2238 Market Street
- 4002 Roosevelt Way
- 518 Queen Anne Avenue
- 1928 3rd Avenue, also described as corner of 3rd Avenue and Virginia Street in the Security Market Building
- 1024 Madison Street
- 4002 10th Ave NE at north end of University Bridge
- 4727 California Avenue SW
- 427 2nd Avenue South
- 3600 South Village Mall
