= Hugo Andresen =

German Romance philologist and medievalist

Hugo Andresen (4 October 1844, in Altona – 17 August 1918, in Münster) was a German Romance philologist and medievalist. He was the son of Germanist Karl Gustaf Andresen (1813–1891).

He studied languages at the universities of Bonn and Berlin, receiving his doctorate in 1874 at Bonn. Following graduation, he took an extended study trip to Paris and London (1874/75), and in 1880 obtained his habilitation for Romance and English philology at the University of Göttingen. In 1892 he relocated to the Münster Academy, where he succeeded Gustav Körting as professor of Romance philology.

== Selected works ==
- Über den einfluss von metrum, assonanz und reim auf die sprache der altfranzösischen dichter, 1874 – On the influence of metrum, assonance and rhyme regarding the language of Old French poetry.
- Maistre Wace's Roman de Rou et des ducs de Normandie (2 volumes, 1877–79) – Robert Wace's Roman de Rou and the dukes of Normandy.
- Ein altfranzösisches Marienlob, aus einer Pariser Handschrift des dreizehnten Jahrhunderts, 1891 – An Old French Marian praise from a Parisian manuscript of the 13th century.
- Ueber deutsche volksetymologie (by Karl Gustav Andresen, 6th edition edited and expanded by Hugo Andresen, 1899) – On German folk etymology.
- Aus einem altfranzösischen Tractat über das Schachspiel, 1913 – An Old French treatise on chess.
- Eine altfranzösische Bearbeitung biblischer Stoffe, 1916 – An Old French edition on biblical subjects.
