= John Considine (impresario) =

American impresario (1868–1943)

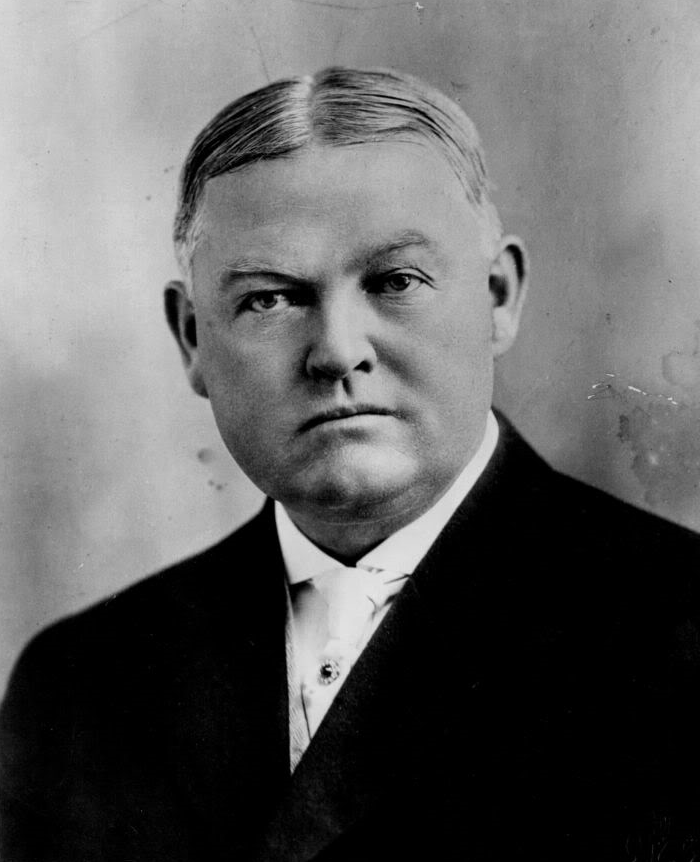
- John W. Considine Sr. Circa 1910
- Born: September 29, 1868; Chicago, Illinois, United States
- Died: February 11, 1943 (aged 74)
- Education: St. Mary's College, Kansas
- Occupation: impresario
- Known for: pioneer of vaudeville, kingpin in Seattle
- Parents: John William Considine (father); Mary (Cusick) (mother)

John W. Considine (September 29, 1868 – February 11, 1943) was an American impresario, a pioneer of vaudeville.

== Youth and arrival on the scene ==
Considine was born in Chicago, the son of Mary (Cusick) and John William Considine, who were Irish immigrants. Considine grew up attending Roman Catholic parochial schools, and eventually briefly attended St. Mary's College, Kansas. Briefly a Chicago policeman, he was involved in the raid that led to the Haymarket Riot. He then became a traveling actor, and landed in Seattle, Washington in 1889. By 1891, he was manager of the People's Theater, a box house in the wide-open "restricted district" below Yesler Way in what is now Seattle's Pioneer Square neighborhood.

A friendly, outgoing, but resolutely sober man in a rowdy environment, he dealt cards but did not play, made money off the sale of liquor but did not drink, managed a business whose profits depended on its female performers hustling drinks (and, in Murray Morgan's words, "If the girls wished to peddle more personal wares, management did not object"), but was reputed to be a faithful family man.

Considine decided that he could out-compete the other box houses by raising the level of entertainment, hiring professional actresses for the stage and letting other girls work the floor and the "dark booths". He prospered greatly for a while, until he was brought down by the Panic of 1893, the ensuing economic depression, and the 1894 election of an "anti-vice" administration in Seattle. He briefly attempted to run the People's Theater as a proper theater; he ran a box house in Spokane, Washington before a similar anti-vice administration shut him down; and he returned to Seattle and lay relatively low until the Klondike Gold Rush (1897) brought back an "open town" administration. By February 1898 he had leased back the People's Theater, and was back in the business along with the rest of Seattle, "mining the miners."

== Rise to prominence ==
Considine brought variety entertainment in Seattle to a new level by importing Farida Mazar Spyropoulos, famous as "Little Egypt" from the World's Columbian Exposition (the Chicago World's Fair of 1893). The People's Theater (and its rivals) posted brass bands outdoors early in the evening to draw in customers. Salvation Army bands merely increased the level of chaos. Business was good.

Considine also obtained an interest in a nearby saloon, Billy the Mug's at the corner of Second and Washington. He operated the rooms above it as the Owl Club Rooms, a gambling joint. He established himself as a power in Seattle, "The Statesman", "The Boss Sport", ward heeler of the wide-open Fourth Ward. He became a power in town, and was locally famous for his personal sobriety (his closest thing to a vice was chewing gum). His burly brother Tom and equally burly associate Doc Shaughnessy were known as his muscle and bodyguards. Shaughnessy, backed by Considine, started a physical culture institute.

=== Conflict with Wyatt Earp ===
Considine was not just big in entertainment: he was the city's gambling kingpin as well. In November 1899, Wyatt Earp left the Dexter Saloon in Nome, Alaska for about a year and went to Seattle, Washington, with a plan to open a saloon and gambling room. On November 25, 1899 the Seattle Star described him as "a man of great reputation among the toughs and criminals, inasmuch as he formerly walked the streets of a rough frontier mining town with big pistols stuck in his belt, spurs on his boots and a devil-may-care expression upon his official face". The Seattle Daily Times was less full of praise, announcing in a very small article that he had a reputation in Arizona as a "bad man".

He faced considerable opposition to his plan from Considine, who controlled all three gaming operations in town. Although gambling was illegal, Considine had worked out an agreement with Police Chief C.S. Reed. But Earp partnered with an established local gambler named Thomas Urquhart and they opened the Union Club saloon and gambling operation in Seattle's Pioneer Square. The Seattle Star noted two weeks later that Earp's saloon was earning a large following. Considine unsuccessfully tried to intimidate Earp, but his saloon continued to prosper. On March 23, 1900, the state of Washington filed charges against several gamblers, including Earp and his partner. The club's furnishings were confiscated and burned. The Earps returned briefly to San Francisco in April 1900, but within a couple of months, Wyatt and Josephine returned to Oregon and caught the SS Alliance for Alaska. Considine continued as king of the Seattle gambling scene afterward.

== Facing off with the police chief ==
As the gold rush era began to wane, the "open town" atmosphere again became a matter of controversy. A former employee of Considine's, William L. Meredith, who had followed Considine to Spokane, returned to his earlier job as a policeman. Meredith and Considine had slowly become enemies, and when Meredith became police chief he started an anti-vice campaign, which was really more of an anti-Considine campaign: he started to enforce laws against Considine's business, while leaving Considine's rivals alone.

The Seattle Post-Intelligencer lashed Meredith for not coming down hard enough on vice. An ambitious politician named John Wilson started a Law and Order League charging Meredith and Mayor Thomas J. Humes with a variety of offenses. The Seattle Times squared off in defense of Meredith and Humes, but the real duel was between Meredith and Considine. When Considine brought forth evidence that Meredith was corrupt, the P-I "played this testimony for as much as it was worth, perhaps more."

Matters escalated. Meredith accused Considine of an affair with Mamie Jenkins, a 17-year-old contortionist who performed at his theater, stating that she had become pregnant and that Meredith himself had paid for her abortion. This was almost certainly a slander: she appears to have ruptured herself while performing. By this time the People's did not even have any closed boxes, but Meredith tried to shut it down under an anti-box-house ordinance, while letting actual box houses continue to operate. The city council decided to believe reports that Meredith was corrupt and his resignation was forced. Protesting a "star chamber" investigation, Meredith resigned. While Considine consulted with his lawyers about further action against Meredith, Meredith got hold of a double-barrelled 12-gauge shotgun.

=== The shootout ===
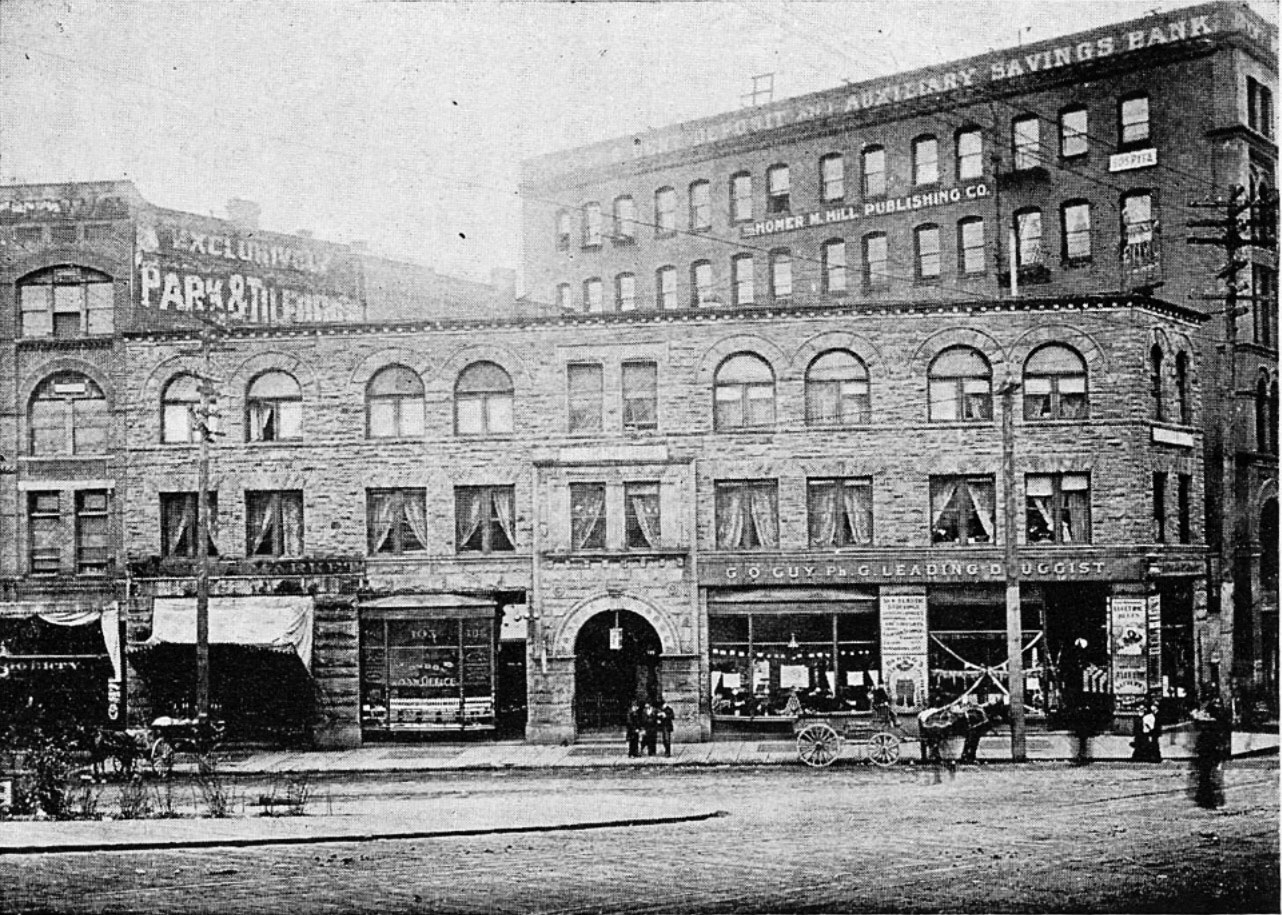
G.O. Guy's drugstore, about a year before the shootout

On the morning of Tuesday, June 25, 1901, Considine dropped by Meredith's lawyer's to inform them that if Meredith would not retract the claim about Mamie Jenkins, he was ready to sue for libel. He and his brother Tom wandered down from their (and the lawyer's) First Hill neighborhood. He dropped by the courthouse hoping to sort out his business's legal problems; the prosecuting attorney was out. At the courthouse, a friend warned him that Meredith was after him, and advised him to arm himself. He went about his day—shooting some pool with his brother, dropping by the office to read his mail, deciding to knock off early because of a sore throat. Forewarned, he picked up a .38 revolver that normally remained at work.

Meanwhile, Meredith had acquired a virtual arsenal: besides the shotgun (which he had wrapped in butcher paper), he was carrying a .32 Colt in a .45 frame and a .38-caliber short-barreled revolver. He had also placed silver dollars strategically around his vest, presumably for armor. He spoke openly of the town "not being big enough" to hold both him and Considine.

Meredith waited at the corner of Yesler and Occidental, where he expected the Considines would go to catch the streetcar back up the hill. He spotted the Considines headed into G.O. Guy's drugstore a block to the east, where John meant to pick up something for his throat. They were standing just outside the store talking with one Patrolman Merford, who Meredith had suspended, according to Gordon Newell "for pocketing part of a protection payment earmarked" for Meredith himself.

Meredith caught up to them just outside the store, took point-blank aim at John Considine with his shotgun, and missed. The dazed Considine staggered into the store; Tom Considine and Merford, were so taken aback that they hardly reacted at first; Meredith entered the store pursuing John Considine.

Meredith's next shot caught the back of Considine's neck, wounded the arm of a messenger boy drinking a sarsaparilla at the soda fountain, and nearly caught Dr. Guy, who hit the floor. Meredith dropped the shotgun and went for the revolver. Considine managed to grab Meredith in a bear hug and drag him toward the entrance, yelling out for help from his brother, who finally realized what was happening. Tom grabbed Meredith's gun and smashed it into Meredith's skull. More police arrived, including Sheriff Cudihee. Tom grabbed one of their guns and drew down on them, yelling "Stand back, you sons of bitches!"

Meanwhile, John Considine drew his gun on Meredith, who was clearly wounded, but still moving. Considine shot Meredith three times in the chest and neck, killing him, then handed his gun to Sheriff Cudihee and surrendered himself.

=== The trial ===
While Meredith had always been part of the "open town" faction, his death made him a martyr for the "closed town" side. At the Considines' trial, the prosecution tried to make the case that the Considines had started the gunfight; however, Meredith's outspoken statements in the 24 hours before the fight (including "They couldn't get a jury in King County that would convict me for killing Considine") helped to clarify any confusion as to what happened, as did the testimony of the best-situated eyewitnesses. The jury took only three hours to reach an acquittal.

== Respectability ==
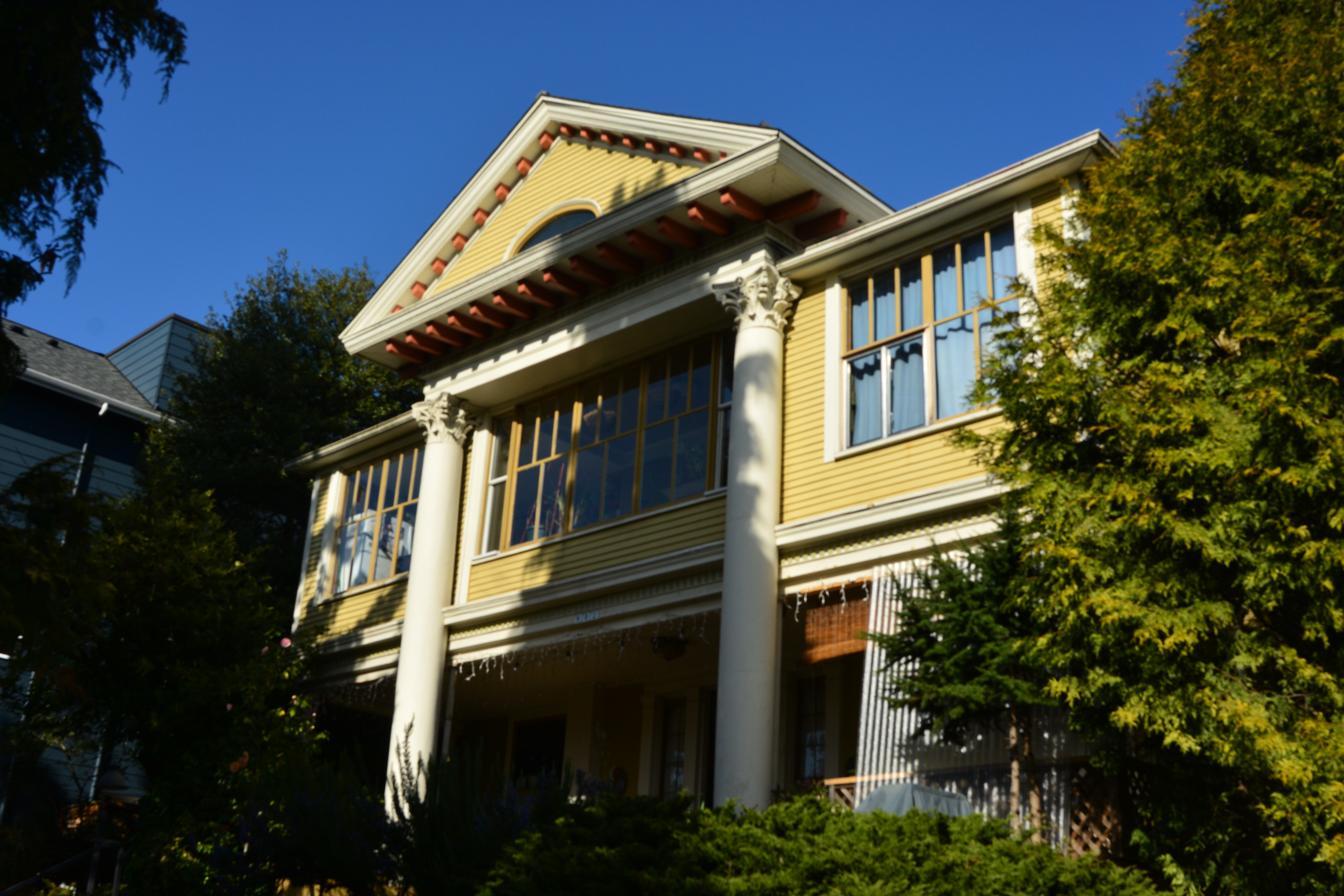
Considine's home in Seattle's Central District was designated a city landmark in 2021.

Considine soon reinvented himself as a respectable impresario north of the Yesler Way "Deadline". In 1902, he bought into Seattle's first well-appointed movie theater (Edison's Unique Theater, established 1897), partnering with the local distributor of Edison phonograph records, creating Seattle's first establishment to combine variety entertainment with movies and Considine's first "dry" establishment.

Difficulty in obtaining first-rate acts to play a city so distant from the major concentrations of North American population led Considine to establish one of the first vaudeville circuits (quite possibly the very first), with theaters in Victoria, Vancouver, Portland, Bellingham, Everett, Yakima, and Spokane as well as Seattle. This was the world's first popularly priced vaudeville chain, with ten- and twenty-cent admissions.

Considine soon cut (or played down) his old ties to the "restricted district". He played a major role in one of the country's rising fraternal organizations: just before the turn of the century he and John Cort, whose career followed a similar trajectory, had founded the Independent Order of Good Things, which soon became the Fraternal Order of Eagles (F.O.E.). A third founder, H. L. Leavitt, soon bolted to the Loyal Order of Moose. In New York City in 1906 on F.O.E. business, he met and teamed up with Tammany boss Big Tim Sullivan to form the Sullivan–Considine vaudeville circuit and associated nationwide booking agency. At it peak, the Sullivan–Considine circuit owned 20 theaters in the Pacific Northwest and was affiliated with 20 in California; they also booked numerous theaters in the Midwest.

While Considine and Cort had always been the friendliest of rivals, Considine's rivalry with another Seattle-based vaudeville impresario, Alexander Pantages, ran more to stealing each other's acts (or, failing that, literally stealing the acts' equipment). Still, they too maintained a cordial personal relationship. Their rivalry took place both on their home turf and on the national scene. Murray Morgan characterizes their rivalry as that between a well-connected, savvy businessman (Considine) and a hardworking uneducated genius (Pantages).

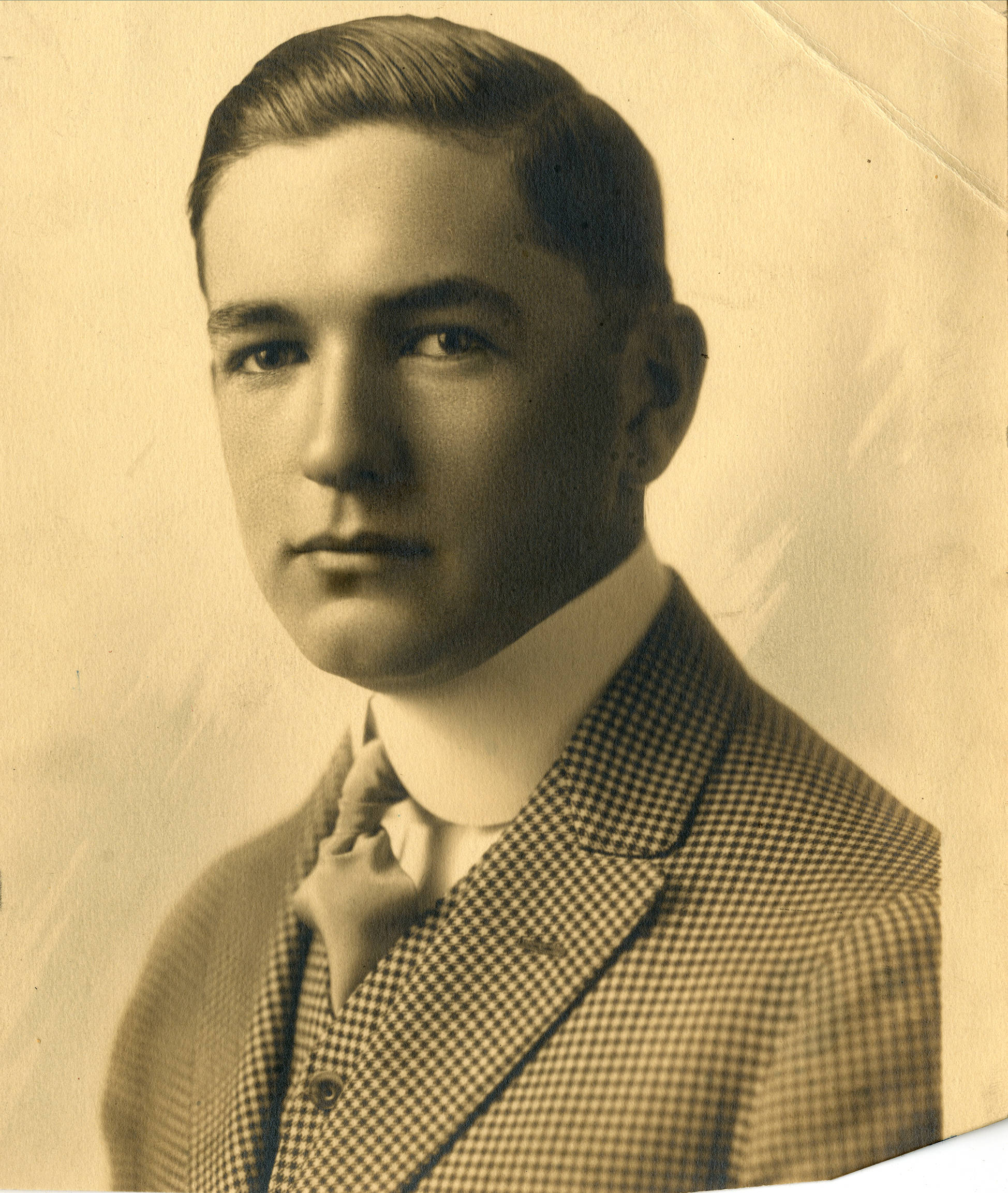
Film producer John W. Considine Jr. in 1916

Pantages simply had a better instinct than Considine for what the public would pay to see, and his total contempt for efforts to "uplift" public taste—and, especially for efforts to impose New York tastes on the country at large—turned out to make good business sense. When Tim Sullivan went insane in 1913, Considine lost one of his main sources of clout and connections. By 1914, Pantages had clearly won out. Considine tried selling out to Marcus Loew (whose eastern-U.S.-based circuit had been allied with the western based Sullivan-Considine circuit since 1911); the deal ultimately fell apart, but a forfeited down payment gave Considine quite an infusion of cash. Still, with World War I clobbering access to international stars, Considine's circuit fell apart, and Pantages bought up the pieces.

All concerned eventually moved to Los Angeles, which by then had firmly established itself as the West Coast entertainment capital. Considine gained a foothold in the film industry. His son, film producer John Considine Jr. (Puttin' on the Ritz, 1930; Boys Town, 1938), married Pantages' daughter Carmen; their sons, John and Tim became successful movie and television actors.

== The original People's Theater building ==
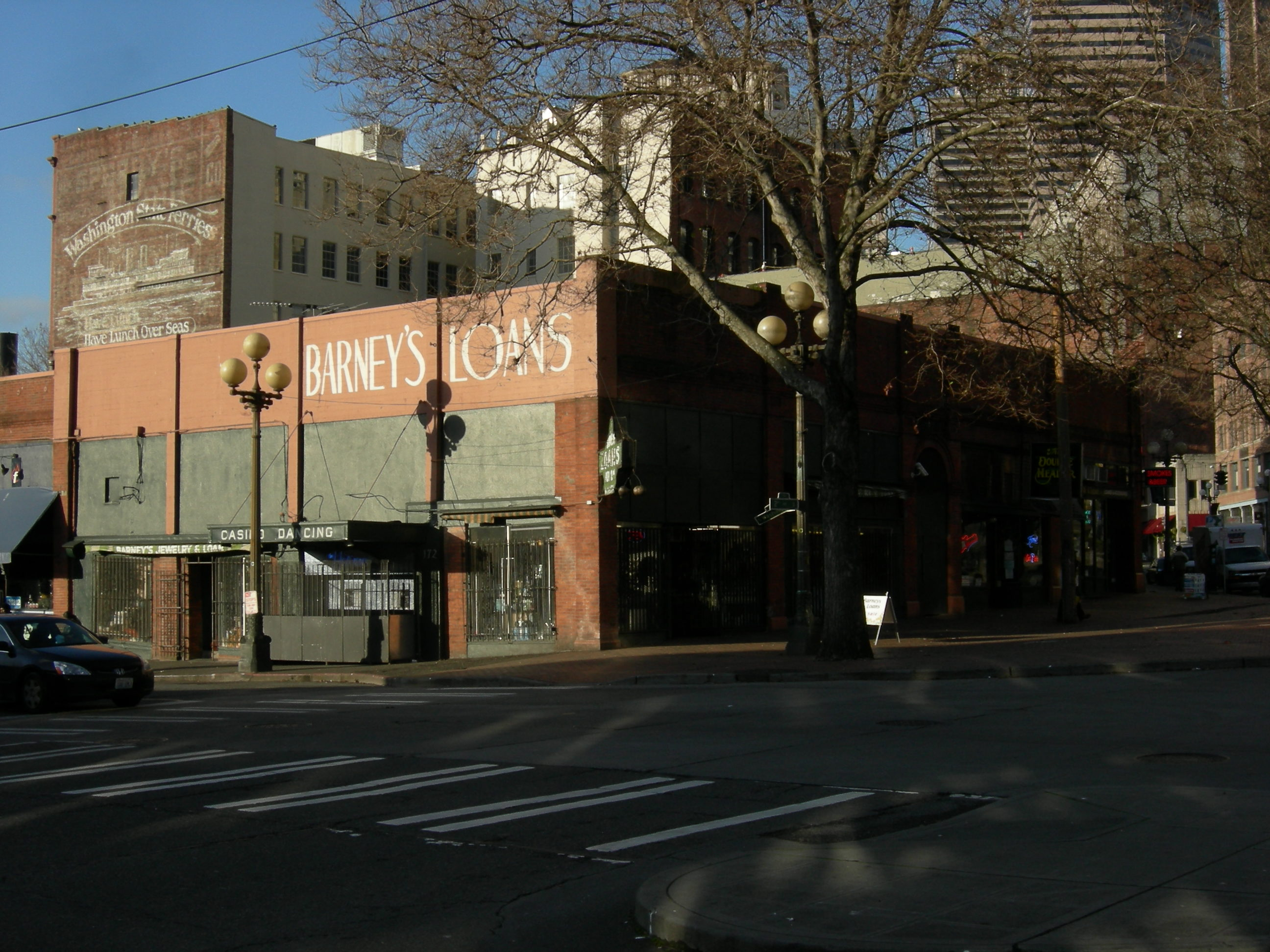
The entrance marked "Casino Dancing" near the left of this picture leads to the former People's Theater.

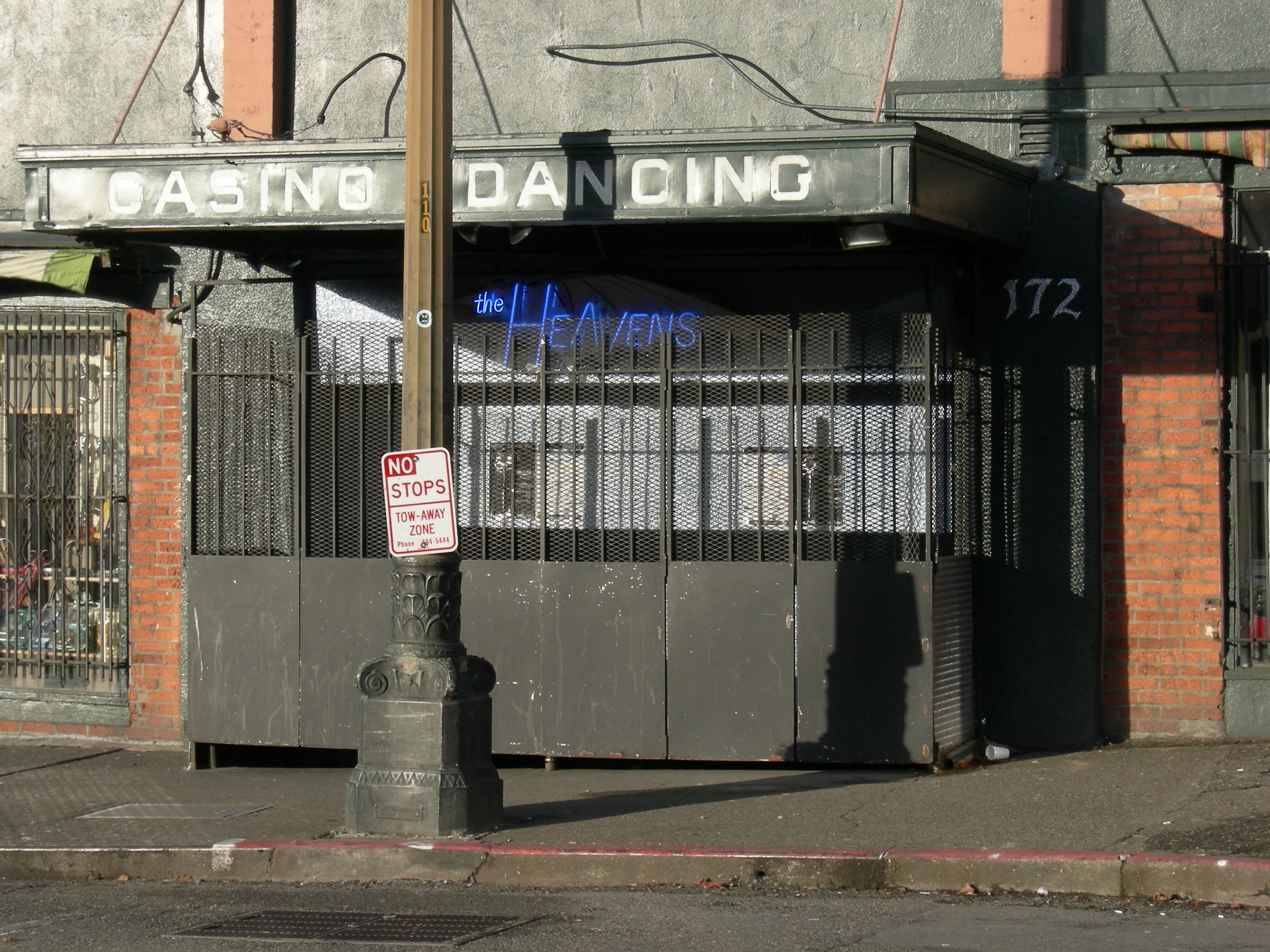
Closeup of that entrance

The 172 S. Washington Street basement that housed Considine's original People's Theater survives, although the building has lost its upper stories. At the corner of Second Avenue South, the remaining aboveground floor houses a pawnshop, Barney's Loans and a longstanding gay/drag bar, the Double Header. The basement has housed a series of bars, including an after hours venue known officially as the Casino, and unofficially as "Madame Peabody’s Dancing Academy for Young Ladies" and, later the Catwalk (1994–2005), a venue friendly to the S&M crowd. Club Heaven, an upscale nightclub, has occupied the space since 2006.

== The Orpheum (1911) ==
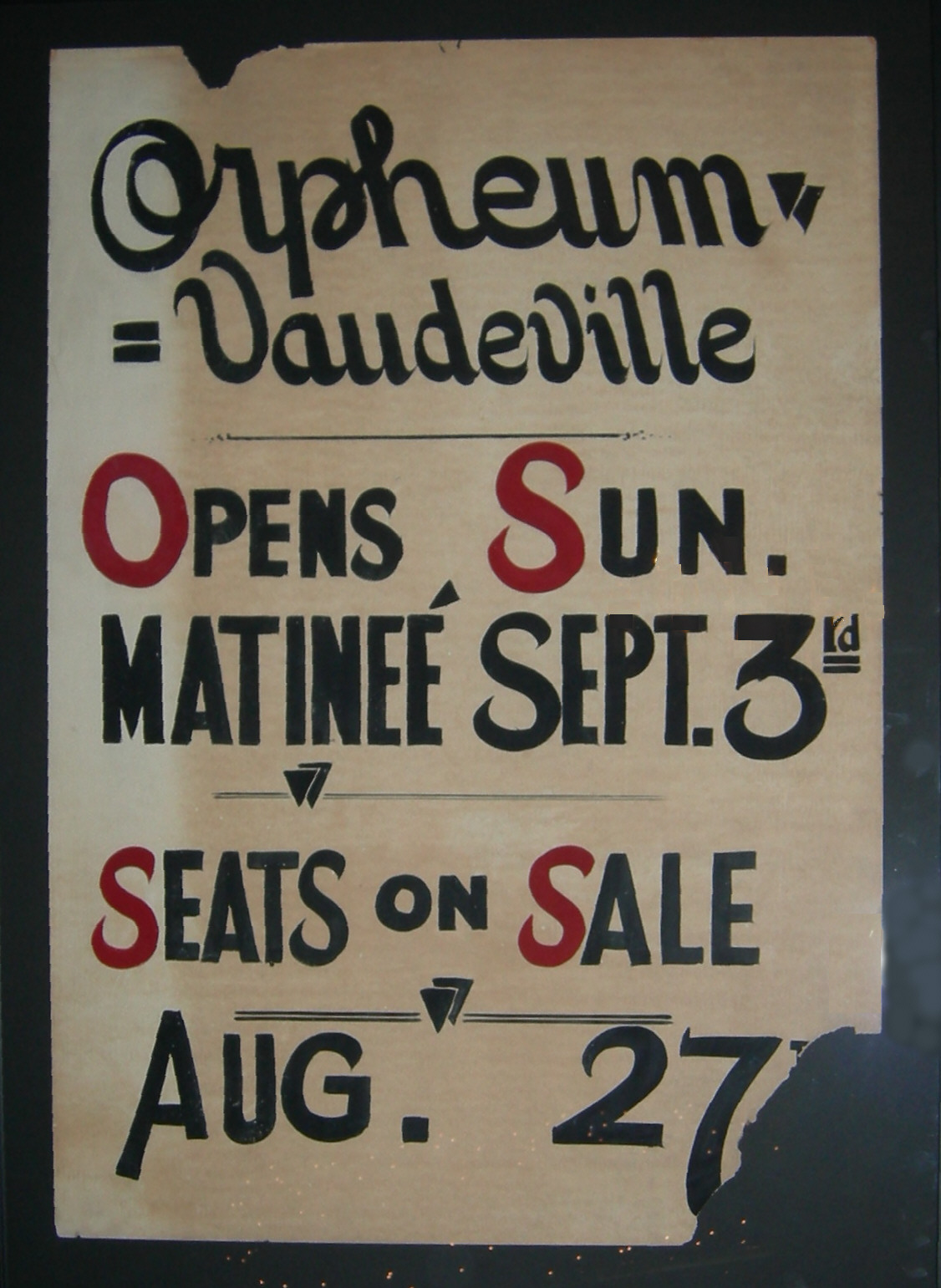
A poster for a post-1916 Orpheum program at the Moore Theatre

From 1911, the flagship of Considine's chain was the Orpheum Theatre at 3rd Avenue and Madison Street in Seattle. Designed by William Kingsley, the $500,000 theater was constructed, insofar as possible, with materials and services obtained from within Washington state. The decorative wrought iron canopy extending from over the box office to the curb out became "a fixture of the 3rd Avenue landscape"; the lavish interior was "awash in marble, onyx, and glass." The murals of the equally lavish auditorium depicted classical and mythological themes: scenes from The Iliad and Odyssey, Aesop and the 12 Muses.

The Orpheum was touted at the time of its 5 May 1911 opening as "America's most luxurious theater," but after 1916, it was no longer was even the grandest vaudeville theater in the neighborhood: Alexander Pantages opened an even larger and more opulent theater several blocks north at 3rd Avenue and University Street. The Orpheum vaudeville shows moved to the larger Moore Theatre, but the Orpheum continued to operate for many years, variously showing live shows and movies; it was renamed as the President Theatre. In it latter years before it was razed in 1949, it was used as a storage facility.

This Orpheum was not Seattle's only theater by this name; indeed, it was Considine's third theater by this name in Seattle. The first had been one of Considine's early vaudeville theaters; the second was a renaming of Martin Beck's Coliseum Theater (no relation to the surviving 1917 Coliseum theater building, designed by B. Marcus Priteca for Pantages). A later Orpheum, also the work of Priteca, stood from 1927 to 1967 at the corner of 5th Avenue and Stewart Street, now the site of the south tower of the Westin Hotel.
