= The Sho-Gun =

1904 musical by George Ade and Gustav Luders

- Comic opera by Gustav Luders
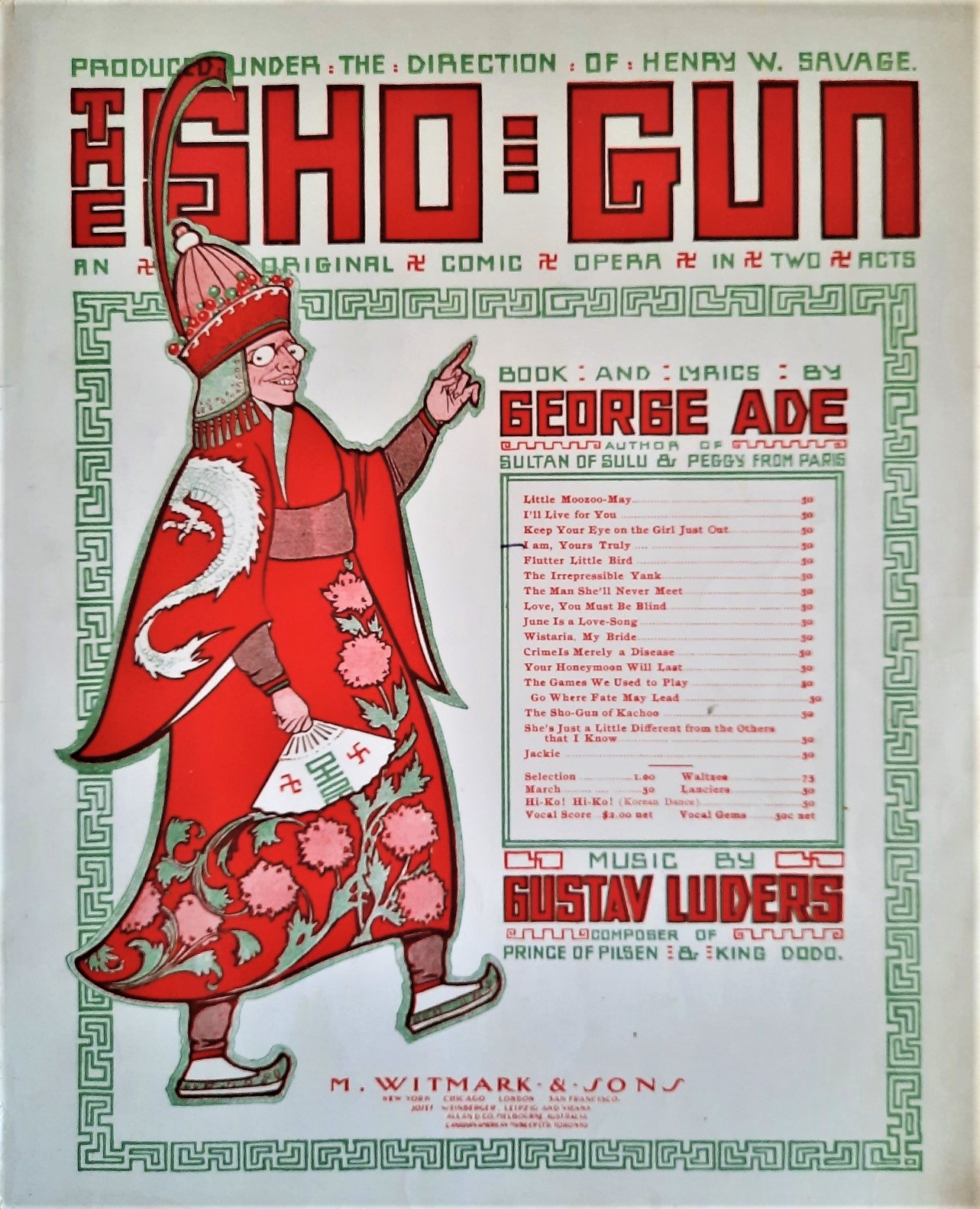
- Poster
- Description: A Comic Opera in Two Acts
- Librettist: George Ade
- Language: English
- Premiere: March 31, 1904; Davidson Theatre, Milwaukee, Wisconsin

The Sho-Gun is a 1904 comedic opera written by George Ade and composed by Gustav Luders.

Set on the fictional Korean island of Ka-Choo, the plot revolves around the arrival of William Henry Spangle, an American businessman, amidst the serene, tradition-bound island ruled by Sho-Gun Flai-Hai.

== Synopsis ==
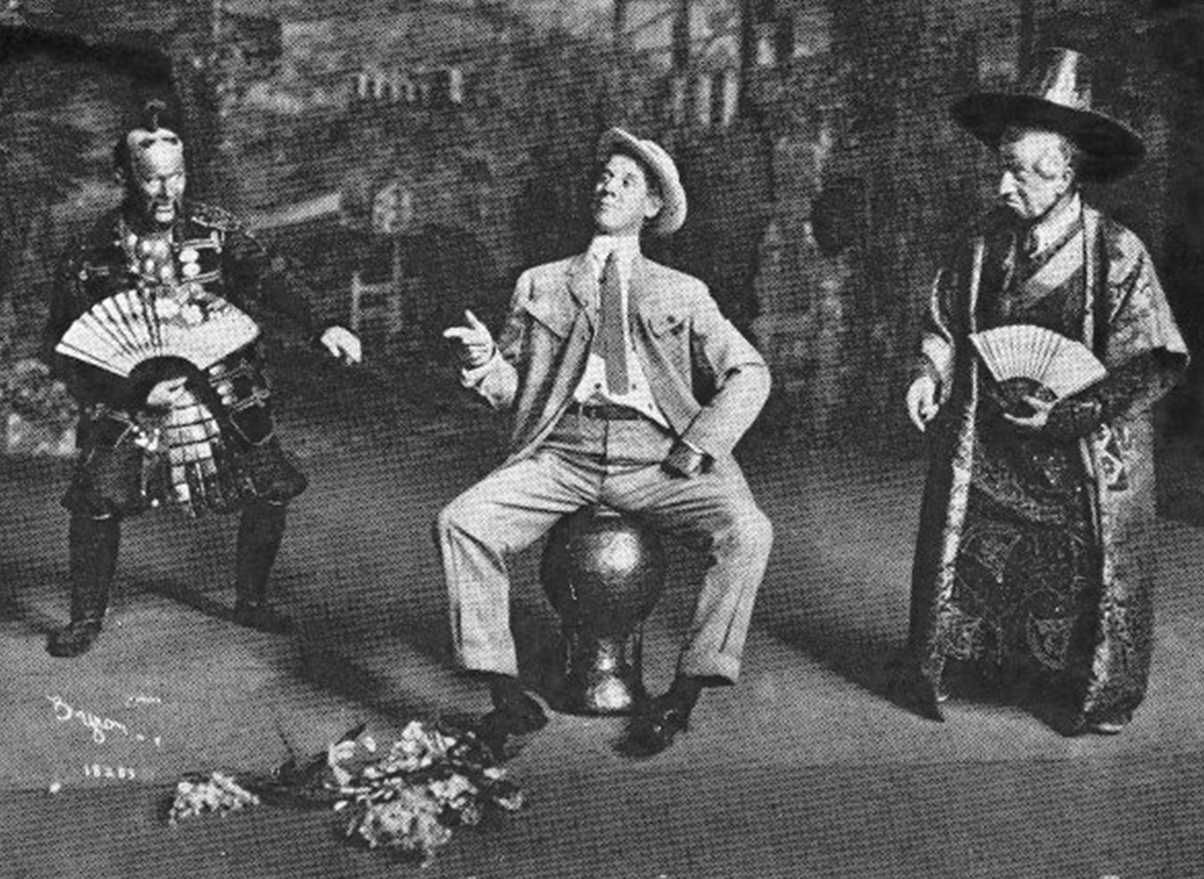
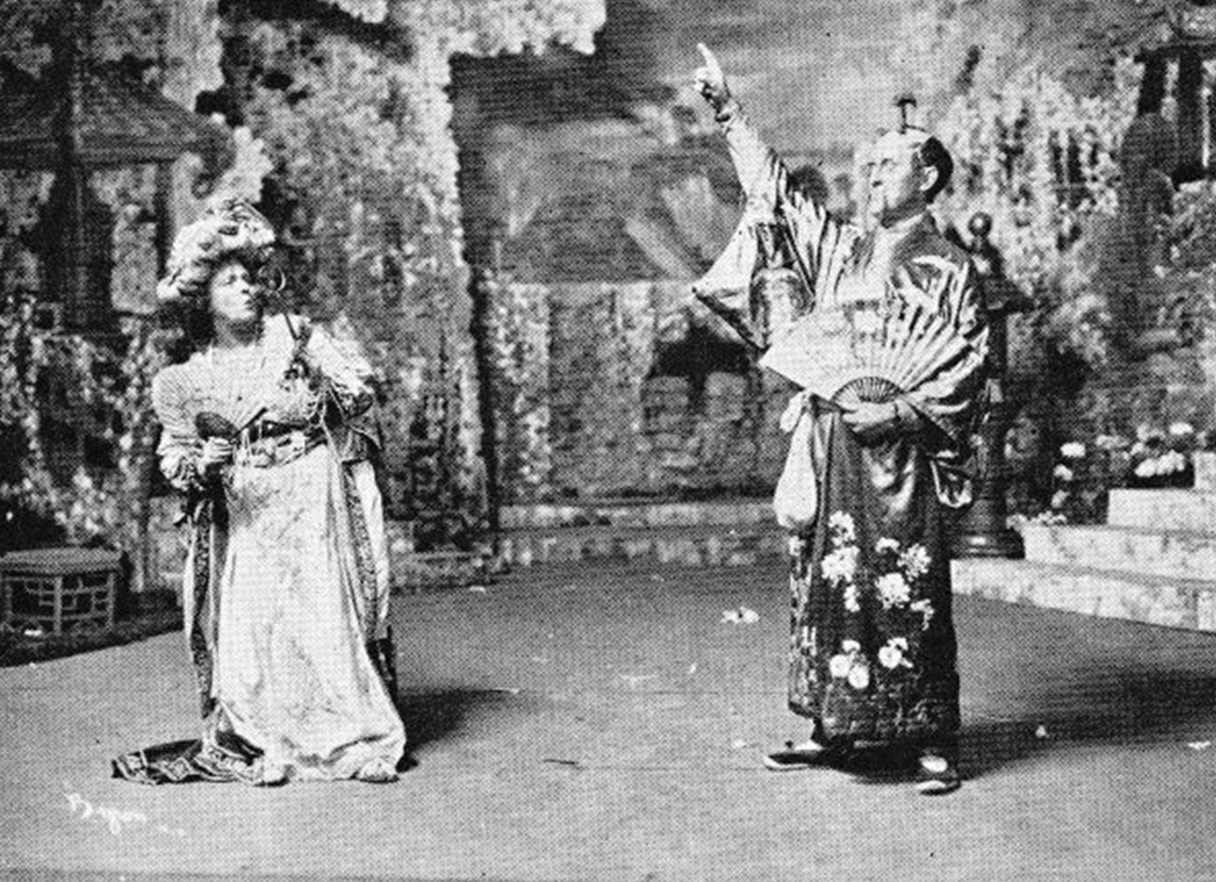
1904 postcards advertising the opera
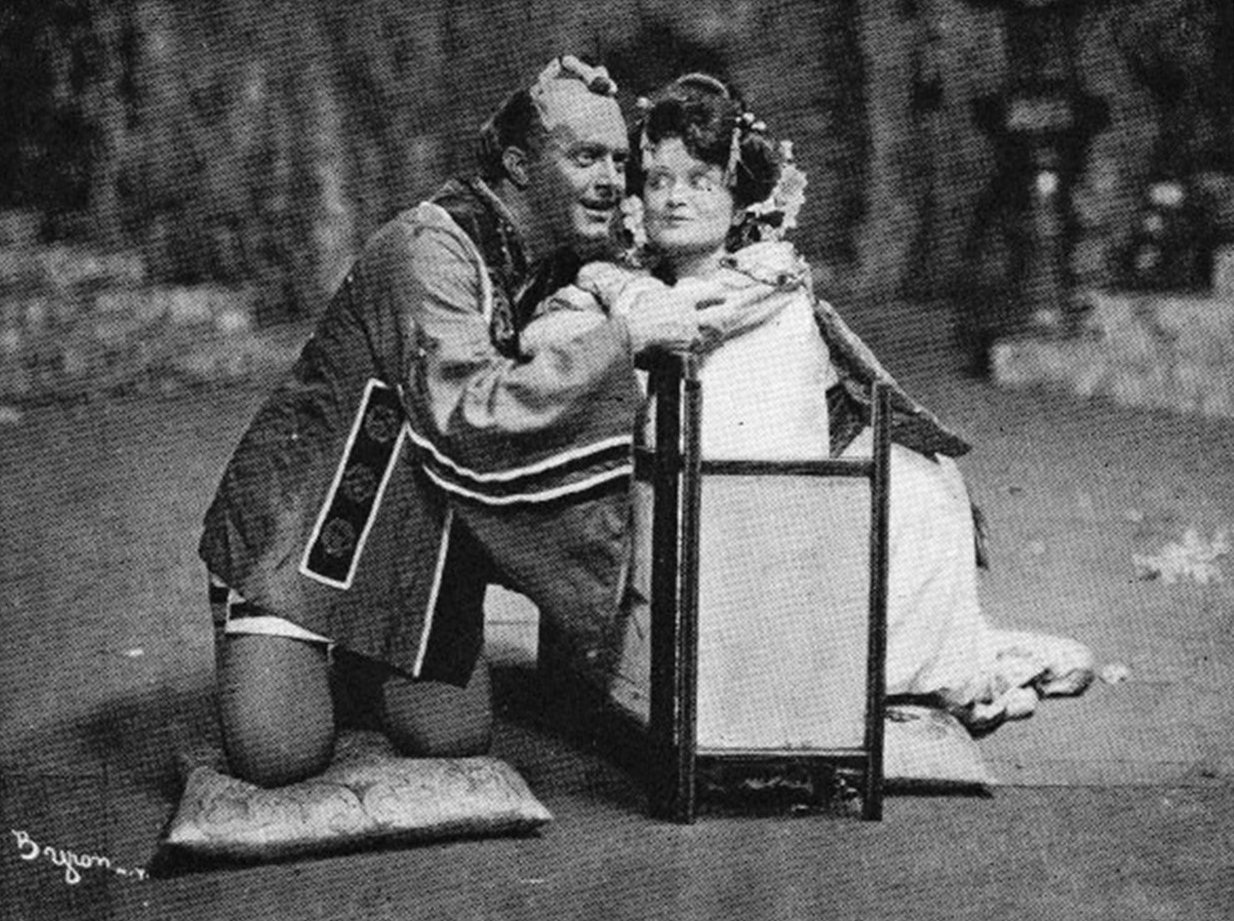
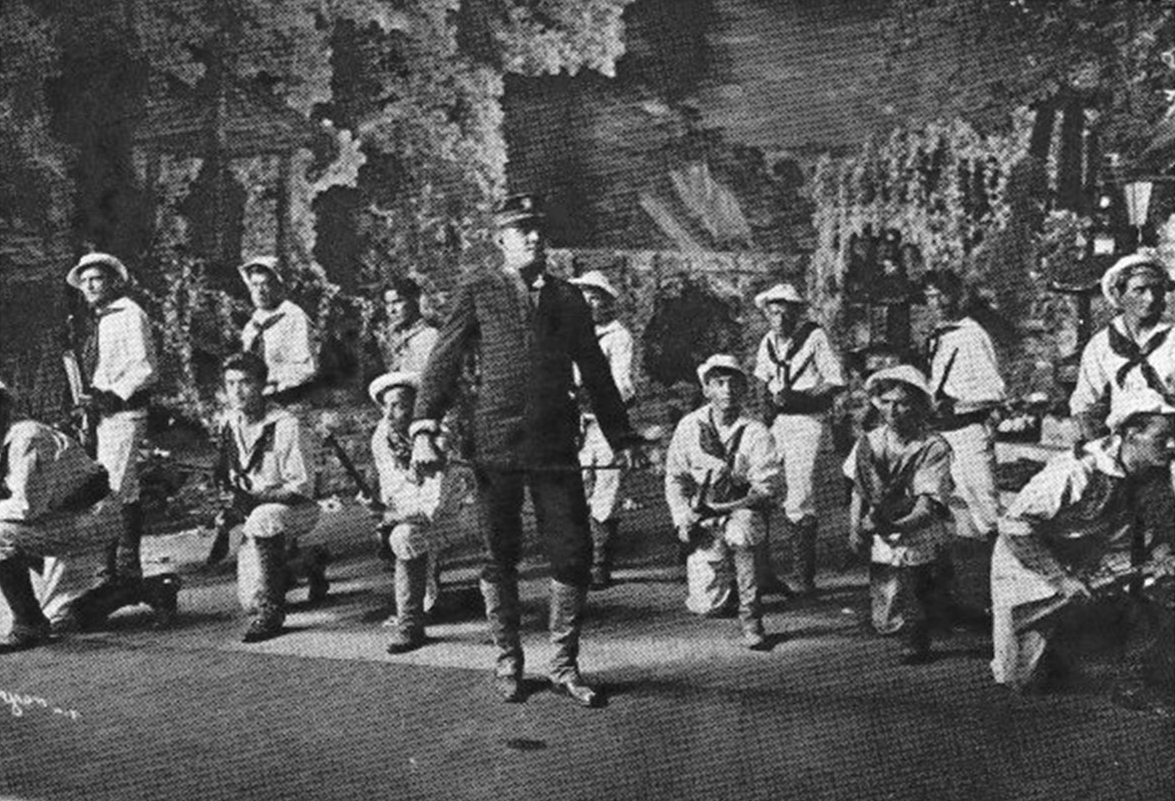
1904 postcards advertising the opera
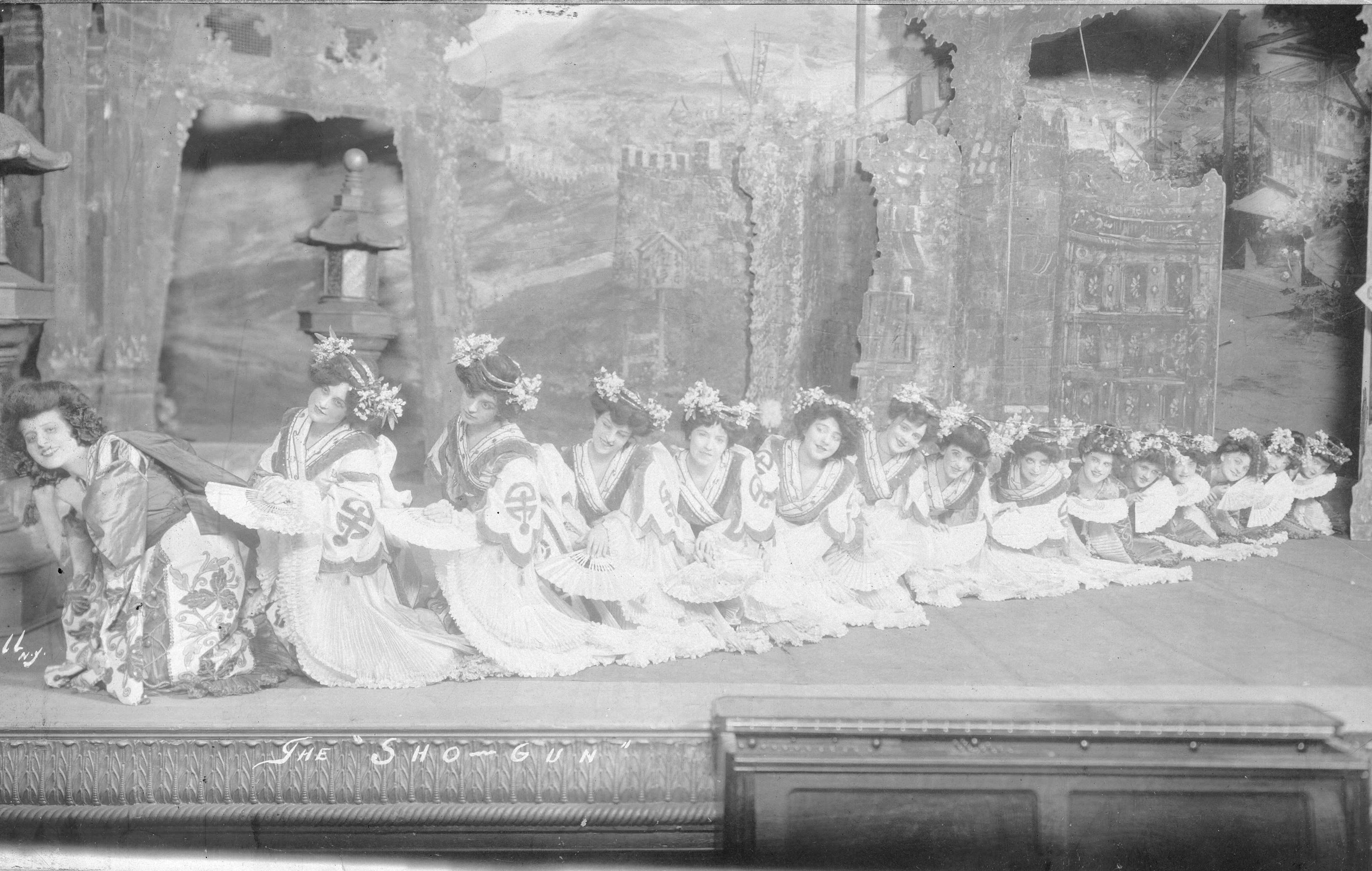
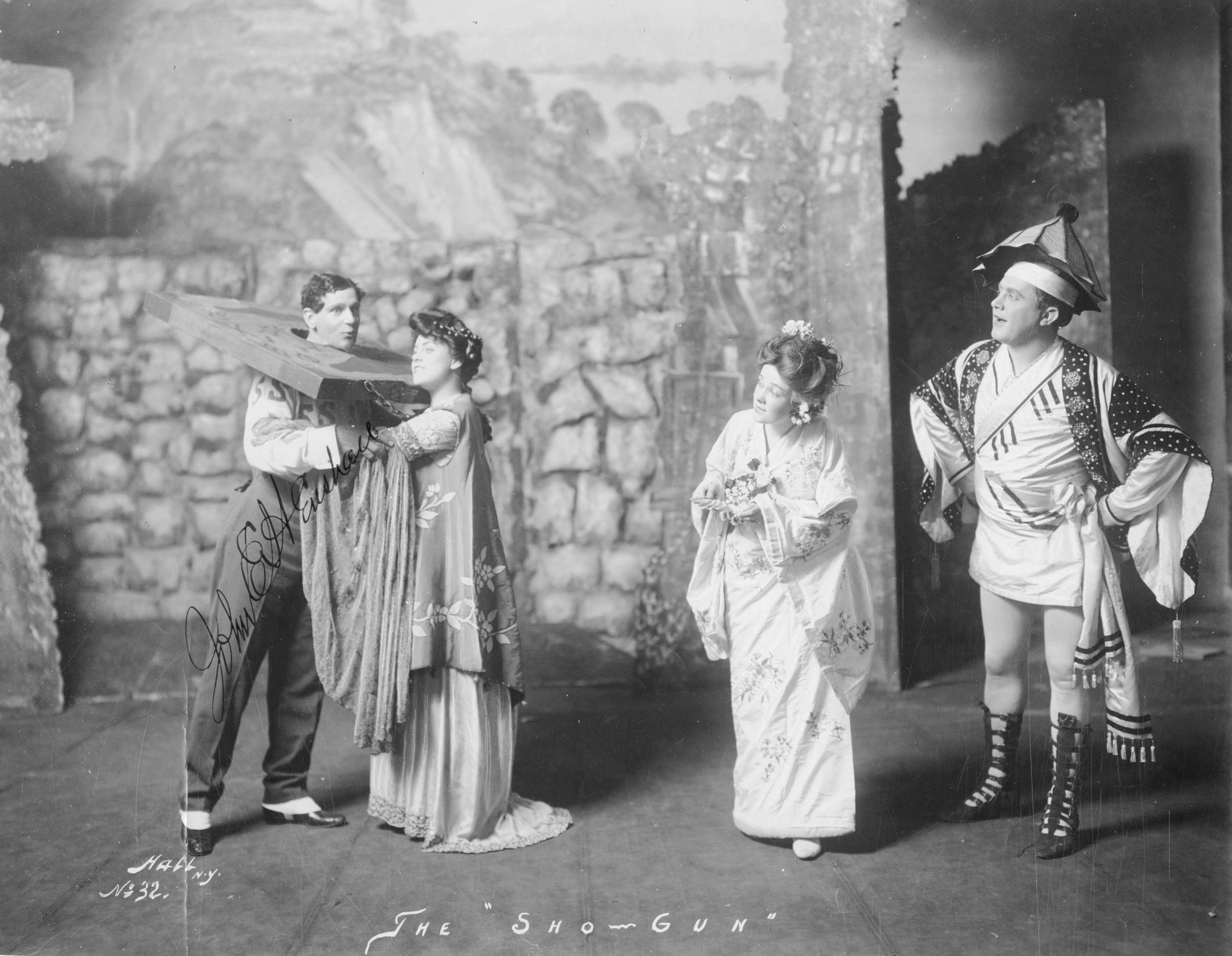
The Sho-Gun being performed at Seattle's Grand Opera House in December 1905.

Businessman William Henry Spangle leaves Iowa and arrives at the Korean island of Ka-Choo in the Sea of Japan during the island's ruler Sho-Gun Flai-Hai's absence on a pilgrimage to China.

Spangle, a whirlwind of financial acumen and chewing gum promotion, disrupts the island's tranquility with his audacious schemes and relentless advertisements for his "Spangles Goo-Goo" product. He rapidly accumulates land and influence, even captivating the widow of the previous Sho-Gun.

However, upon his return, Flai-Hai is incensed by the cultural upheaval and the U.S. presence. He finds his domain transformed, his authority challenged by the enterprising American and his island overrun by sailors and marines. Facing resistance from Spangle and his newfound unionized executioners, Flai-Hai ultimately relinquishes his position, paving the way for Spangle's temporary reign.

Faced with execution, Spangle leverages his influence over the executioner's union, ultimately leading to Flai-Hai's abdication. A landing party from the U.S. Navy arrives, only to find Spangle in absolute control. The deposed Sho-Gun recognizes Spangle's royal lineage, granting him legitimacy through a royal decree which affirms his own noble lineage. Spangle soon relinquishes his island holdings and returns to his beloved Iowa, leaving behind a grateful Tee-To and a forever-altered Ka-Choo.

== Performance history ==
"Korean Dance" (1904), by Gustav Luders
The "Korean Dance" from act two of the opera.

The Sho-Gun was produced by Henry W. Savage and debuted at the Davidson Theater in Milwaukee, Wisconsin on March 31, 1904. It ran at Wallack's Theatre and other U.S. cities from October 10, 1904, to January 21, 1905, with 125 performances. Christie MacDonald was one of the cast members during this run.

In December 1905, the play was performed at the Grand Opera House in Seattle, Washington.

In March 1953, the play was performed by students in South Bend, Indiana.

== Reception ==
"Hi-Ko, Hi-Ko" (1904), by Gustav Luders
"Hi-Ko, Hi-Ko", also known as "Korean Dance", adapted from act two of the opera.

The Sho-Gun received positive reviews from critics during its initial run, with The Minneapolis Journal and The New York Times giving it high marks.

The "Korean Dance" portion from act two of the opera was later adapted and published separately to sheet music as "Hi-Ko, Hi-Ko".
