= Karl Gustaf Andresen =

German linguist

- Born: 1 June 1813; Uetersen
- Died: 25 May 1891 (aged 77); Bonn
- Education: University of Kiel
- Occupation: Linguist.

Karl Gustaf Andresen (1 June 1813, in Uetersen, Duchy of Holstein – 25 May 1891, in Bonn) was a German linguist. He was the father of Romance philologist Hugo Andresen (1844–1918).

He studied philology at the University of Kiel as a pupil of Gregor Wilhelm Nitzsch, receiving his doctorate in 1837. Afterwards, he worked as a schoolteacher in Altona (from 1839) and Mülheim an der Ruhr (from 1858). In 1870 he obtained his habilitation at the University of Bonn, where in 1874 he became an associate professor.

== Selected works ==
- Ueber deutsche Orthographie, 1855 – On German orthography.
- Die deutschen Familiennamen, 1862 – German surnames.
- Über die Sprache Jacob Grimms, 1869 – On the language of Jacob Grimm.
- Die altdeutschen Personennamen in ihrer Entwickelung und Erscheinung als heutige Geschlechtsnamen, 1873 – Old German personal names in their development and appearance.
- Ueber deutsche Volksetymologie (1877, 7th edition 1919) – On German folk etymology.
- Sprachgebrauch und Sprachrichtigkeit im Deutschen (1880, 12th edition 1967) – Common and clear language in German.
