= John Cort (impresario) =

American impresario

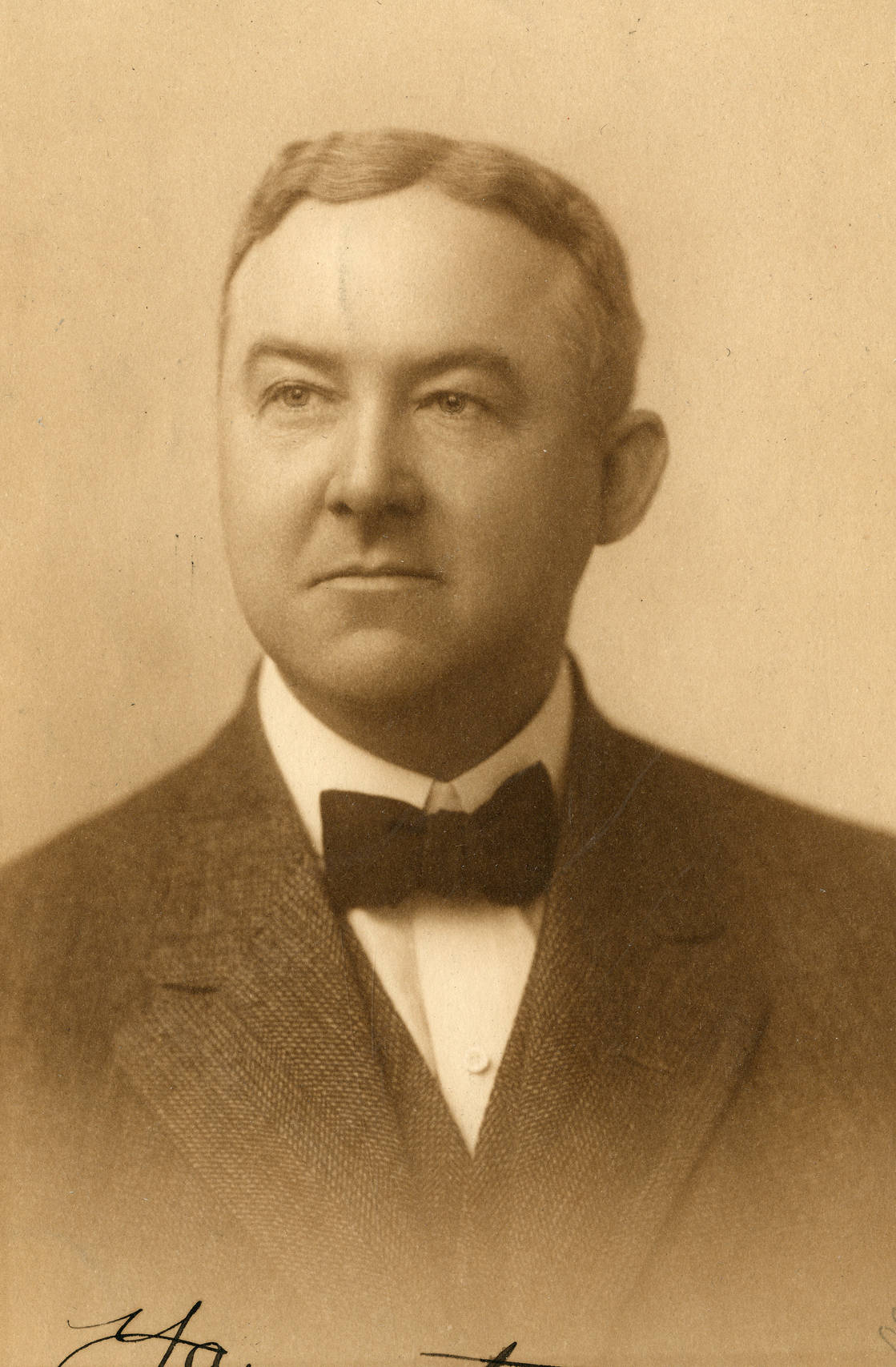

Background information
- Born: ca. 1861; New York City, United States
- Died: November 1929 (aged 67–68)
- Occupation: Impresario

John Cort (ca. 1861 – November 17, 1929) was an American impresario; his Cort Circuit was one of the first national theater circuits. Along with John Considine and Alexander Pantages, Cort was one of the Seattle-based entrepreneurs who parlayed their success in the years following the Klondike Gold Rush into an impact on America's national theater scene. While Considine and Pantages focused mainly on vaudeville, Cort focused on legitimate theater. At one time, he owned more legitimate theaters than anyone else in the United States, and he eventually became part of the New York theatrical establishment. His Cort Theatre (since renamed the James Earl Jones Theatre) remains a fixture of Broadway.

== Variety theater years ==
Born in New York City, Cort started his career as a stage actor of little distinction and as part of a comedy duo, Cort and Murphy. He first became a theater manager in Cairo, Illinois, then headed west to take over the Standard Theater, a Seattle box house (a cross between a variety theater, a saloon, and—often—a brothel), which he turned into the city's leading such establishment. A pioneer of theater circuits—booking the same act successively into multiple cities to make it worth their while to tour to his remote part of the country—he was so successful that in 1888 he built a new 800-seat Standard Theater at the southeast corner of Occidental and Washington streets. This was Seattle's first theater with electric lighting, more modern than the gas-lit Frye's Opera House, the city's leading legitimate theater at the time.

The Great Seattle Fire (June 6, 1889) burned this new Standard and nearly all of Seattle's other places of entertainment. Cort reopened two weeks later in a tent, and by November he had erected a replacement for the Standard.

== Going legitimate ==
Like John Considine, Cort left Seattle during the depression (and anti-vice reaction) that followed the Panic of 1893, but returned after the Klondike Gold Rush to build the Grand Opera House (opened 1900) on Cherry Street. Geographically he had crossed north of "the Deadline", Yesler Way, out of the vice-ridden "restricted zone". Artistically, he had crossed from variety entertainment into legitimate theater.

With Considine, he played a major role in one of the country's rising fraternal organizations: just before the turn of the century they founded what became the Fraternal Order of Eagles (F.O.E.). A third founder, H. L. Leavitt, soon bolted to found the Loyal Order of Moose.

Graphics for a program from Cort's Moore Theatre, Seattle, circa 1907

By 1903, Cort's Northwestern Theatrical Association controlled 37 theaters in the American West, allowing him to compete with some success against the Eastern entertainment establishment. He signed an agreement with Marcus Klaw and Abraham Erlanger, then the country's leading booking agents of dramatic talent, and his theaters became part of the Klaw and Erlanger Circuit. At this point, he was Seattle's leading theatrical impresario. However, Klaw and Erlanger were more focused on box-office potential than artistic merit, and Cort's position in the market had given him an audience with some critical faculties. If people were being offered badly produced plays, they would skip legitimate theater entirely and go see a vaudeville show.

In 1910, Cort helped organize the Independent National Theatre Owner's Association, a group of circuits that tried to break away from the New York-based syndicates. Allied with the independent Shubert Organization, these added up to 1200 theaters nationally. They eventually forced Klaw and Erlanger to allow theaters to book both Klaw/Erlanger productions and others. Still, while the fight was on, Klaw and Erlanger had backed construction of Seattle's new Metropolitan Theatre in the prestigious Metropolitan Tract. Cort, in turn, headed for New York, where he became a notable producer and manager, as well as the founder of New York's Cort, now James Earl Jones, Theatre.

He built the Cort Theatre in San Francisco which opened in 1911.

In the summers of 1916-1918, Ruby Stevens (the future Barbara Stanwyck), travelled with the show, watching her elder sister Mildred perform.

== Seattle remnants ==
Cort's Grand Opera House suffered several fires; one of these, in 1917, gutted it, and the building has been a parking garage since 1923. The Moore Theatre, Cort's last Seattle flagship, is still going strong as of 2007.
