= Cort =

Cort may refer to:

== People ==
- Cornelis Cort (1536–1578), Dutch engraver
- Henry Cort (1740–1800), English ironmaster
- Hendrik Frans de Cort (1742–1810), Flemish landscape painter
- Frans de Cort (1834–1878), Flemish writer
- John Cort (impresario) (1861–1929), American impresario
- John Cyrus Cort (1913–2006), American Christian socialist writer and activist
- Bud Cort (1948–2026), American actor
- John E. Cort (born 1953), American indologist and writer on Jainism
- Barry Cort (born 1956), American baseball player
- Carl Cort (born 1977), English footballer
- Leon Cort (born 1979), English footballer
- Liam Cort (born 1989), English basketball player

== Other uses ==
- Cortistatin (neuropeptide), encoded by the CORT gene
- Cortisol, a hormone
- Cortinarius, a genus of mushrooms
- Cort Guitars, a guitar manufacturer based in South Korea
- Cort v. Ash, 1975 case in the United States Supreme Court
- CO Roubaix-Tourcoing, a French football club
- Cort, a fictional character in the Stephen King Universe.
