= National Theatre Owners Association =

US theatre owner's organization founded in 1910

The National Theatre Owners Association was an organization of independent theatre owners in the United States founded in 1910. Its chairman was the impresario John Cort.

The NTOA was founded in May of that year by the owners of 1,200 small town theatres and was backed by the Shubert brothers. This act contributed to the Theatrical Syndicate's loss of control over American theatre.
