= Liam Cort =

English basketball player (born 1989)

Liam Cort (born 1989) is a basketball player who played for the Milton Keynes Lions. He progressed through the Milton Keynes Lions junior ranks before joining the Lions senior team.

Because of his height (6 ft 3 in) Cort mainly played guard.
