= KORT-FM =

Radio station in Grangeville, Idaho

- Grangeville, Idaho; United States
- Broadcast area: Grangerville, Kamiah, and Pierce, Idaho
- Frequency: 92.7 MHz
- Branding: Big Country 92.7

Programming
- Format: Country music
- Affiliations: Cumulus Media Networks

Ownership
- Owner: James Nelly, Jr. and Darcy Nelly; (Nelly Broadcasting Idaho, LLC)
- Sister stations: KORT (AM)

History
- First air date: 1979

Technical information
- Licensing authority: FCC
- Facility ID: 136
- Class: C3
- ERP: 360 watts
- HAAT: 717 meters
- Transmitter coordinates: 45°51′48″N 116°7′24″W
- Translators: 92.3 K222DL (Riggins); 93.3 K227EA (Grangeville); 95.9 K240AP (Pierce)

Links
- Public license information: Public file; LMS
- Webcast: Listen Live
- Website: kortradio.com

KORT-FM (92.7 FM) is a radio station broadcasting a country music format. Licensed to Grangeville, Idaho, United States, the station is currently owned by James Nelly, Jr. and Darcy Nelly through licensee Nelly Broadcasting Idaho, LLC, and features programming from Cumulus Media.

== History ==
KORT-FM (92.7 FM) first began broadcasting in 1979 as a sister station to the existing AM outlet. The station was officially granted its license to cover by the Federal Communications Commission on October 6, 1980. Throughout its early decades, the station was owned and operated by the Clearwater Broadcasting Company, which maintained a staff of roughly ten employees to manage both the AM and FM operations.

In its early years, KORT-FM established itself as the primary country music station for the Camas prairie, a format it has maintained for over 40 years. The station eventually transitioned from Clearwater Broadcasting to Nelly Broadcasting Idaho, LLC, which currently operates the station under the branding "Big Country 92.7".

== Translators ==
In addition to the main station, KORT-FM is relayed by an additional three translators to widen its broadcast area.

Call sign	Frequency	City of license	FID	ERP (W)	Class	FCC info
K222DL	92.3 FM	Grangeville, Idaho	134	165	D	LMS
K227EA	93.3 FM	Riggins, Idaho	146402	250	D	LMS
K240AP	95.9 FM	Pierce, Idaho	139	45	D	LMS
