= KORT (AM) =

- Grangeville, Idaho; United States
- Broadcast area: Grangerville, Idaho and surrounding area.
- Frequency: 1230 kHz
- Branding: 96.9 KORT FM

Programming
- Format: Classic hits
- Affiliations: Cumulus Media Networks

Ownership
- Owner: James Nelly, Jr. and Darcy Nelly; (Nelly Broadcasting Idaho, LLC)
- Sister stations: KORT-FM

History
- First air date: 1954 (as KFWR)
- Former call signs: KFWR (1953–1957)

Technical information
- Licensing authority: FCC
- Facility ID: 138
- Class: C
- Power: 1,000 watts unlimited
- Transmitter coordinates: 45°55′52″N 116°7′50″W
- Translator: 96.9 K245CH (Grangeville)

Links
- Public license information: Public file; LMS
- Webcast: Listen Live
- Website: 969kortfm.com

KORT (1230 AM) is a radio station broadcasting a classic hits format. Licensed to Grangeville, Idaho, United States, the station is currently owned by James Nelly, Jr. and Darcy Nelly through licensee Nelly Broadcasting Idaho, LLC, and features programming from Cumulus Media Networks.

== History ==
KORT first signed on the air on October 8, 1954. Ownership of KORT (1230 AM) began with the Grangeville Broadcasting Company, which established the station in 1954 under the leadership of partners Hub Warner and Dave G. Ainsworth. By 1957, the station was fully owned by Dave G. Ainsworth, who also served as the general manager. The station was founded by the Grangeville Broadcasting Company and originally operated with a power of 250 watts. By the mid-1960s, ownership had transferred to the Clearwater Broadcasting Company, which sought federal approval to increase the station's daytime signal strength to 1,000 watts. The station expanded its reach in 1979 with the addition of KORT-FM, and both stations were eventually acquired by their current owner, Nelly Broadcasting Idaho, LLC.

Under its current branding as "Big Country 92.7," the station serves as the flagship for the "Big Country News Connection," providing a localized digital news agency for the Clearwater Valley alongside its music format.
