= Fia Wille =

German designer and interior architect (1868–1920)

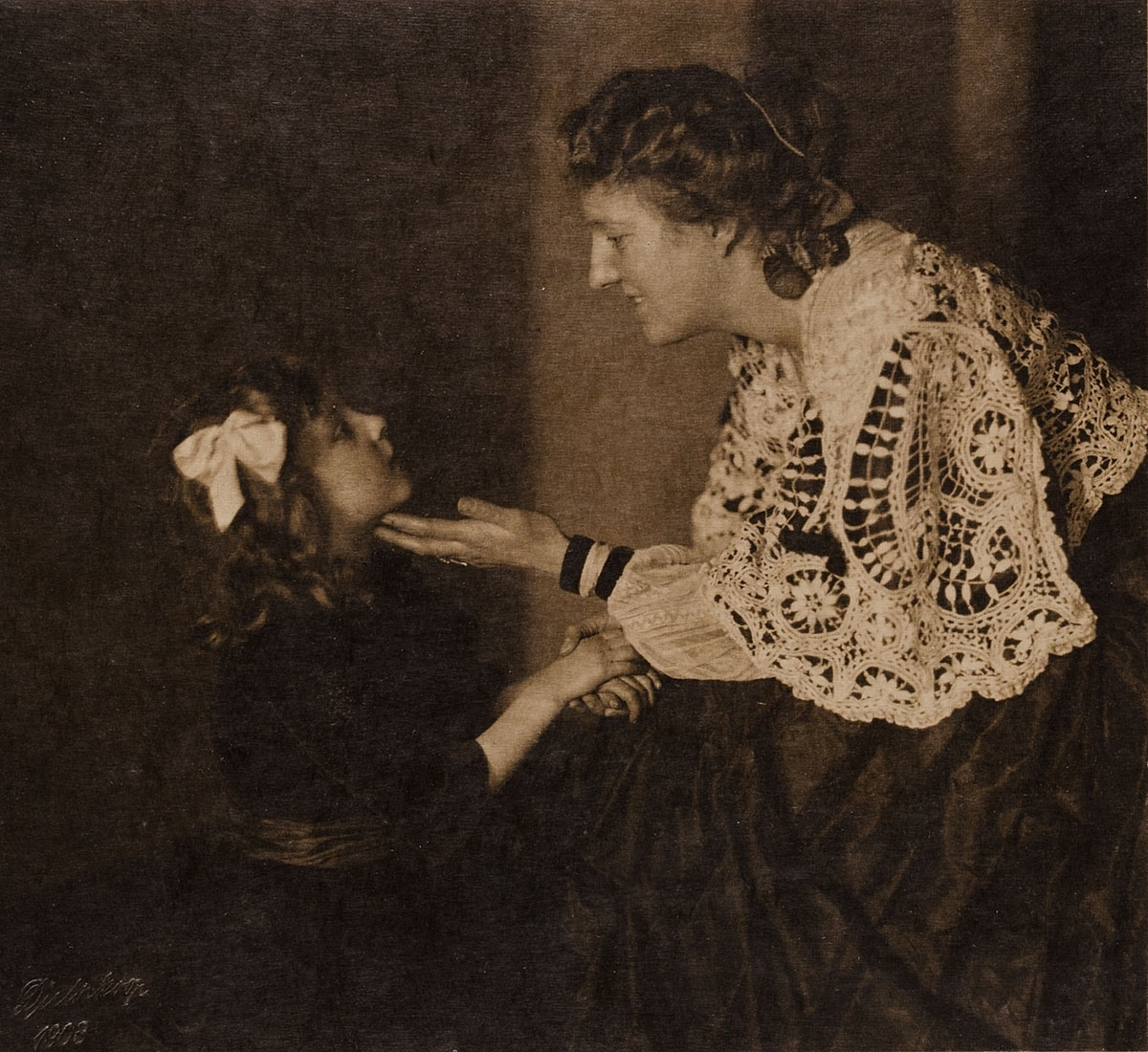
- Fia Wille with her daughter (1908)
- Born: Sophie Körting; 24 May 1868; Bad Bentheim, Germany
- Died: 20 September 1920 (aged 52); Hanover, Germany
- Burial place: Cemetery of Engeshode
- Occupations: Designer; interior architect
- Spouses: Georg Hugo Wilhelm Otto Dietlein * Rudolf Wille
- Children: 5

Fia Wille (24 May 1868 – 20 September 1920) was a German designer and interior architect. From 1900 to around 1914, she ran an interior design company in Berlin with Rudolf Wille. Her work included, in addition to interior design, embroidery, illustration, and the design of furniture and clothing within the context of the fashion reform movement. Her award-winning designs appeared in numerous exhibitions.

== Biography ==
Sophie Körting, known as Fia, was born on 24 May 1868 in Bad Bentheim. She was descended from the Körting family of industrialists, founders of Körting Hannover machinery. Her parents were Sophie Pieper and Berthold Körting, an economic advisor. She attended a school of arts and crafts at a time when, in the German Empire, women only emerged as professional creators toward the end of the 19th century.

She was married twice. First to Lieutenant Georg Hugo Wilhelm Otto Dietlein with whom she had one daughter and three sons. In 1900, she married engineer and self-taught designer Rudolf Georg Wille (1873–1950). Their daughter was named Rudifia.

== Professional activity ==
With Rudolf Wille, she established a well-regarded partnership that produced embroidery, illustration, furniture design and interior architecture. Their workshop on Kurfürstenstrasse in Berlin's Tiergarten District offered designs to suppliers of modern applied arts in Berlin. Their clientele included Hohenzollern-Kunstgewerbehaus, the Keller & Reiner Salon, the A. Wertheim Department Store and the AS Ball Furniture Factory.

=== Dress reform movement ===
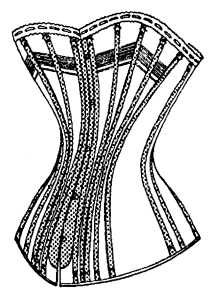
Corset of 1880

Wille actively participated in the dress reform movement of the late 19th-century, which campaigned for abandoning the tightly laced corset in favor of looser-fitting garments that allowed women to move more freely. At the exhibition devoted to "artistic clothing" in Berlin in 1905, Wille presented a loose-fitting summer dress that she designed so it followed the natural contours of the female body, instead of a tightly laced waist and torso.

For an article about the exhibition titled The Woman in Home and Work, Fia Wille was photographed in her office at a drawing board, bent over an architectural image and wearing a reform dress that she had designed. In another photograph for the widely circulated women's magazine The German Woman, she was photographed with her baby son dressed in a similar garment. She thus asserted herself as both a professional and a mother. Together, these two photographs challenged stereotypes that considered the practice of architecture ill-suited to women.

=== Lyceum Club ===
In 1905, Wille became involved in the newly formed Lyceum Club Berlin, an international women's association. For the first two years, Wille joined the club's permanent jury for decorative arts, which chose the women who were permitted to exhibit their art. She became the club's president in 1906. In 1909, she organized the Christmas exhibition for women decorative arts artists at Keller & Reiner. In 1910 and 1911, she arranged for the winter and Christmas exhibitions to be held in her own studio of Rudolf and Fia Wille.

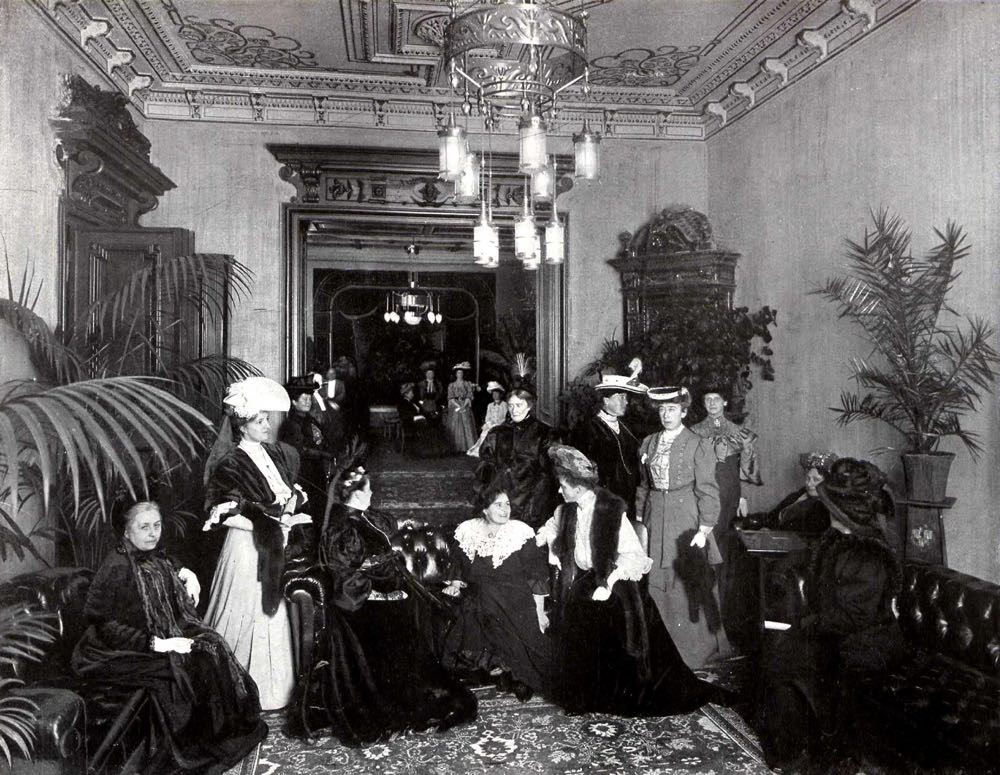
1905 opening of the Berlin Lyceum Club. Fia Wille is second from the left.

In 1912, Fia Wille actively participated in the Lyceum Club's major exhibition, Women at Home and at Work, organized by Hedwig Heyl in the halls of the Zoological Garden, which aimed to showcase women's achievements. Wille designed the reception hall and the adjoining dining room. She also headed the domestic economy department and, with Else Oppler, the clothing section. At the Congress of German Women, held at the same time in the halls of the Zoological Garden, Fia Wille's lecture featured this quote: " How many secret works are created in degrading conditions and for minimal remuneration, simply because the people concerned feel that their status prevents them from working publicly for payment?"

In early 1910, the Wille's founded Rudolf & Fia Wille GmbH, a craft and interior design shop, at 8 Lennéstrasse in Berlin-Tiergarten, where they exhibited their own interior designs as well as designs based on other creators' models. The couple initially focused on designing modern, handcrafted objects and complete interior furnishings, outsourcing production to external workshops such as Keller & Reine for bronzes and embroidery, the jeweler Lameyer for jeweled belt buckles, KM Seifert of Dresden for lighting fixtures, and the carpet manufacturer Benjamin and Co. for rugs. From this point onward, they also designed houses and eventually designed and built their own home, a country residence on the Wannsee. It was the subject of an article titled "The personal house. Interview with Wille" in the newspaper The World of Women.

In 1912, Fia Wille stated, "Craftsmanship means above all the creation of a good basic form, derived from technology and the requirements of use."

=== House of Women ===
At the 1914 Leipzig International Book Trade and Graphic Arts Exhibition, Fia Wille participated in the special exhibition Women in the Book Trade and in Graphic Arts, with Lina von Schauroth of Frankfurt am Main, and Margarete Brugmann, from Leipzig. She chaired the advertising and promotional materials committee of the House of Women and designed the interior layout of the tea room, which served as an event space and meeting place.

== Last years ==
There is no information on the activities of the company Rudolf & Fia Wille GmbH after 1914.

Fia Wille was 52 when she died in Hanover on 20 September 1920. She is buried in the Engesohde City Cemetery.

== Selected awards ==
- 1902 Rudolf and Fia Wille: Third prize in the competition of the wallpaper factory Flamersheim & Steinmann
- 1903 Rudolf and Fia Wille: Edler & Krische poster competition, Hanover
- 1903 Rudolf and Fia Wille: Diploma of Recognition, International Exhibition of Modern Decorative Arts, Turin, Italy
- 1903 Rudolf and Fia Wille: First prize at the Wurzen carpet factory competition, Smyrna carpet design competition
- 1903 Rudolf and Fia Wille: Third prize and purchase in the linoleum pattern design competition
- 1906 Rudolf and Fia Wille: First prize at the competition of the Deutsche Modezeitung, Leipzig, for artistic creations for crafts
- 1914 Fia Wille: City of Leipzig Prize for Interior Architecture
