= Georg Körting =

Georg Körting (13 May 1844, Berlin – 1919) was a German Chief Surgeon General of the Guards Corps in the First World War.

In 1909 he oversaw the publication of the German army textbook on nursing.

== Kokampf ==
After the Armistice, Körting became commander of the Kommando der KampfwagenabteilungKörting or Kokampf, a unit in the Freikorps. They were based at the Kraftfahrer-Kaserne in Lankwitz in the outskirts of Berlin. They painted "'Panzer-Kraftwagen-Abteilung / Regierungs-treue-Truppen" (Panzer-Automobile Division / Government-loyal-troops) upon their vehicles.

He died in 1919.
