= Heinrich Körting =

German philologist

Heinrich Körting (15 March 1859 – 19 July 1890) was a German philologist and a brother of Gustav Körting.

Like his brother he was a Romance scholar. He was born in Leipzig, became Privatdozent in 1885, and in 1889 an associate professor at the University of Leipzig. He was co-editor of the journal Zeitschrift für neufranzösische Sprache und Literatur.

== Published works ==
- Über zwei religiöse paraphrasen Pierre Corneille's; L'imitation de Jésus-Christ und die Louanges de la Sainte Vierge (1882) – On two religious paraphrases of Pierre Corneille; "L'imitation de Jésus-Christ" and the "Louanges de la Sainte Vierge".
- Geschichte des französischen Romans im XVII Jahrhundert (second edition, 1891) – The history of the French novel in the 17th century.
