= Kord =

Kord may refer to:

- ASV Kord, a Russian anti-materiel rifle
- O'Hare International Airport, with ICAO airport code KORD
- The Kord machine gun
- Kord (Greyhawk), a fictional deity in the Dungeons & Dragons role-playing game
- Kurdish people (Kord in Iranian sources)
- KORD-FM, a radio station (102.7 FM) licensed to Richland, Washington, United States
- Kord, Iran, a village in Golestan Province, Iran
- Kord-e Olya, a village in Isfahan Province, Iran
- Kord-e Sofla, a village in Isfahan Province, Iran
- Rapid Operational Response Unit (KORD), National Police of Ukraine
- KORD (Kontrol Raketnykh Dvigateley), the first stage engine control system of the Soviet N1 rocket

== See also ==
- Cord (disambiguation)
