= Murray Morgan =

American historian and journalist

Murray Cromwell Morgan (1916–2000) was an author and historian of the Puget Sound region. Throughout his life he was also a writer, journalist, and political activist. He was a history teacher at Tacoma Community College.

== Early life ==
Murray Morgan was born February 16, 1916, in Tacoma, Washington. His parents were Henry Victor Morgan and Adda Camille Layne Pearne Morgan. His father was a Unitarian Universalist minister and his mother wrote plays for the theater. Henry published his wife's plays and his poetry.

== Education ==
He graduated from Stadium High School in Tacoma in 1933. He attended the University of Washington and was editor for its paper, UW Daily. Morgan wrote an article about the prevalence of venereal disease among the university's students, which resulted in him being suspended. He graduated from UW in 1937. Morgan attended Columbia University in New York, where he received a master's degree in communication.

== Career ==
=== Journalist ===
Morgan was a journalist for the regional Hoquiam Daily Washingtonian and national news outlets, including Time and the New York Herald Tribune. He was also a radio personality for the Columbia Broadcasting System (CBS).

=== Historian ===
He was a noted historian of the Pacific Northwest, particularly Puget Sound. Some of his most noteworthy works are Skid Road, the "longest-running Pacific Northwest book in print" which was written about Seattle in 1946 and Puget's Sound written about Tacoma. Among other topics, he wrote about the Alaska Gold Rush, the Columbia River, the Aleutian Islands.

Morgan taught history at Tacoma Community College.

Murray might have held a chair in any of the distinguished professorships of history, but he reached more people on the subject of Northwest history than any other historian. People valued what Murray Morgan wrote.

— David Nicandri, Washington State History Museum director

== Personal life ==
In 1939, Morgan married Emma Rose Northcutt at the Unitarian Universalist church where his father was minister. He and his bride, nicknamed Rosa, spent their honeymoon in paddling a kayak on the Danube River. At the onset of World War II, "found themselves briefly immersed" in the wartime activities. The couple lived in a log cabin in Auburn; their home was previously Trout Lake Dance Hall. They had a daughter, Lane Morgan.

Morgan was diagnosed with stomach cancer in 1964. He was told that he had less than a year to live, but was able to overcome cancer. His treatment included surgery and a prescribed diet of hamburgers for breakfast.

He died on June 22, 2000, in Tacoma, Washington.

== Legacy ==
The Murray Morgan Bridge in Tacoma, originally known as the 11th Street Bridge, was renamed in 1997 to honor Morgan for his contributions as a Pacific Northwest historian of his generation. Morgan was a bridge tender on the bridge during the 1940s.

== Published works ==
Murray Morgan

- Bridge to Russia Those Amazing Aleutians. BiblioBazaar. August 2011. ISBN 978-1-174-69040-2.
- Century 21: The Story of the Seattle World's Fair, 1962. Acme Press. 1963.
- Confederate raider in the north Pacific: the saga of the C.S.S. Shenandoah, 1864-65. Washington State University Press. 1948. ISBN 978-0-87422-123-7.
- Day of the Dead. David McKay Company. 1946.
- Dixie raider: the saga of the C. S. S. Shenandoah. E. P. Dutton. 1948.
- Doctors to the world. R. Hale Ltd. 1959.
- Le Barrage: ("the Dam"). Librairie Istra. 1957.
- One Man's Gold Rush : a Klondike Album. University of Washington Press. 1972. ISBN 978-0-295-97851-2.
- Puget's Sound: A Narrative of Early Tacoma and the Southern Sound. University of Washington Press. 1 January 2003. ISBN 978-0-295-98303-5.
- Skid Road: An Informal Portrait of Seattle. Ballantine Books. 1983 [1951]. ISBN 978-0-394-24310-8.
- The Columbia: Powerhouse of the West. Superior Publishing Company. 1949.
- The Dam. Literary Licensing, LLC. June 2012. ISBN 978-1-258-36733-6.
- The Friend of the Family: 100 Years with Washington Mutual. Washington Mutual Financial Group. 1989.
- The hospital women built for children. Children's Hospital Medical Center. 1967.
- The Last Wilderness. 1976.
- The Mill on the Boot: The Story of the St. Paul & Tacoma Lumber Company. Washington State Historical Society [by the] University of Washington Press. 1 January 1982. ISBN 978-0-295-95949-8.
- The Northwest Corner, the Pacific Northwest.
- The Viewless Winds. Oregon State University Press, Northwest Reprints series. 1990. ISBN 0-87071-505-4.

Co-author

- Lane Morgan; Murray Morgan (1982). Seattle: A Pictorial History. Donning Company. ISBN 978-0-89865-091-4.
- Alice Shorett; Murray Morgan (1 January 2007). Soul of the City: The Pike Place Public Market. Market Foundation. ISBN 978-0-295-98746-0.
