= Box house =

Combination of a theater and brothel

A box house was a combination of low-class theater and brothel, found in western North America in the late 19th and early 20th centuries. It offered light entertainment "such as magic acts, singing, dancing, minstrel shows," as well as sexual services. Box houses were an antecedent of American vaudeville.

== Meaning ==
Murray Morgan describes a box house as "a saloon with a theater attached," which "competed with establishments offering even rougher entertainment." Many of Seattle's box houses in the wide-open "restricted district" below Yesler Way were located in basements and operated only in the dry season, because they flooded in the wet winter. Others were built over the tideflats and would dump over-rowdy customers into the water through trap doors.

Morgan quotes a contemporary article in Coast Magazine describing the Theater-Comique, a typical box house:

A nervous opium-eating individual was hammering away at a piano. … Not a woman was to be seen in the row of seats… Around the sides of the room and at the end opposite the stage were built out of thin pine boards apartments with an opening toward the platform and a barn-like door leading into the narrow passageway along the wall. In each room was an electric torch button which communicated with a bar set up behind the stage. The boxes were unlighted… In these boxes were women, one in some, more in others. … Women with dresses [reaching] nearly to the point above their knees, with stained and sweaty tights, with bare arms and necks uncovered halfway to their waists

Some of the box houses were not as "low" as this: at least one, run by a supposedly titled Englishman featured women in evening gowns and humor at the level of the double entendre. The "king" of Seattle's box houses was John Considine, originally an actor, who raised the level of entertainment and eventually became a pioneer of vaudeville.
