= Gustav Körting =

German philologist

Gustav Carl Otto Körting (25 June 1845 – 1 February 1913) was a German philologist, whose specialty was focused on Romance languages and English. He was a brother of Heinrich Körting.

He was born in Dresden and taught there after four years of study at Leipzig (1863–67). From 1876 he taught classes in Romance and English philology at the Academy in Münster, and in 1892 relocated to the University of Kiel as a professor of Romance philology. In 1879 he became editor with Eduard Koschwitz of the "Zeitschrift für neufranzösische Sprache und Litteratur" and afterwards of "Französische Studien" (1881–89).

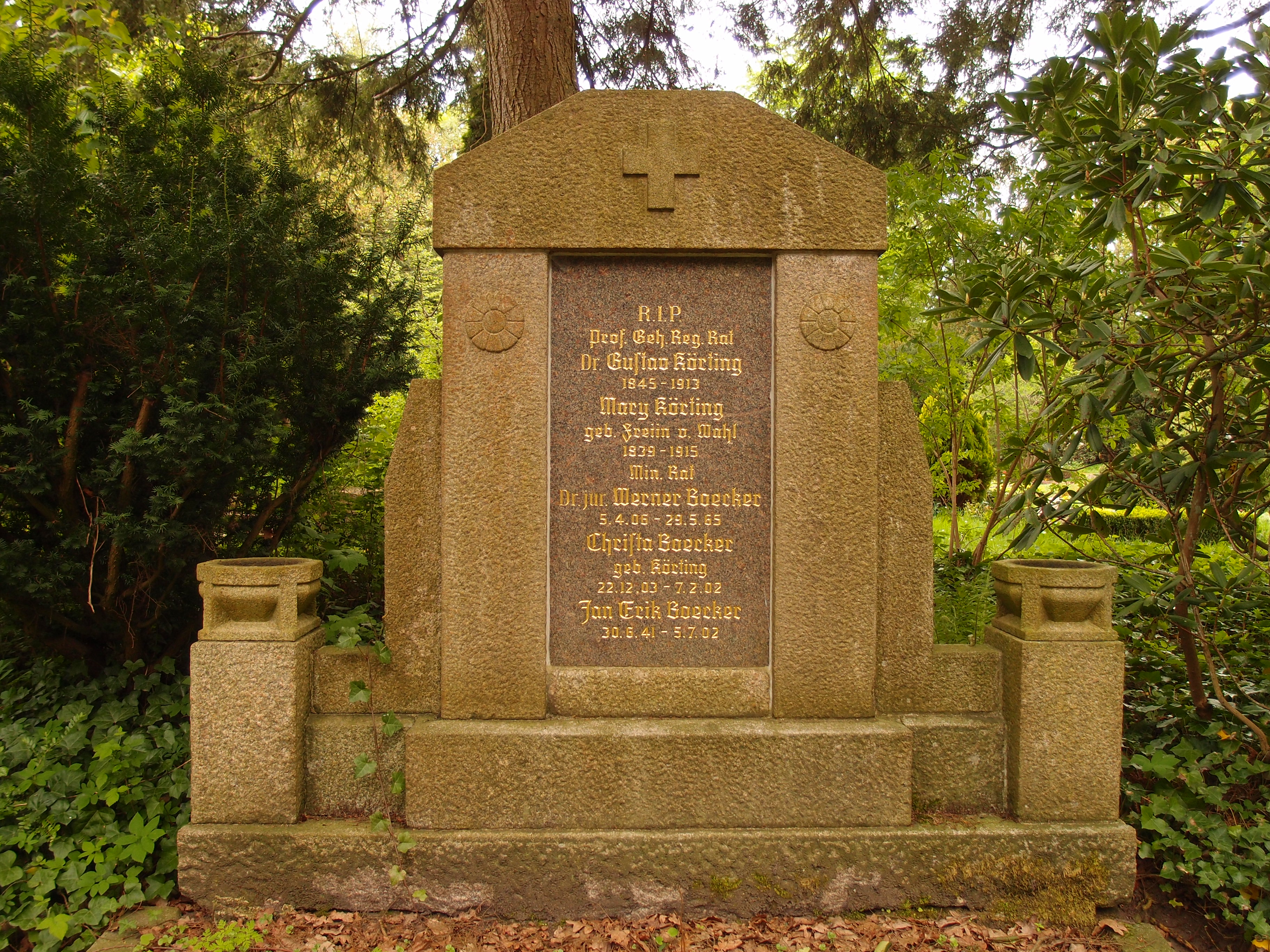
Grave of Gustav Körting at the Parkfriedhof Eichhof in Kiel

== Published works ==
His more important works are:

- Ueber die Quellen des Roman de Rou (1867) – On the source of the Roman de Rou.
- Diktys und Dares: Ein Beitrag zur Geschichte der Troja-Sage (1874) – Dictys and Dares, a contribution to the history of the Trojan legend.
- Petrarca's Leben und Werke (1878) – Petrarch's life and work.
- Geschichte der Litteratur Italiens (1878–84) – History of Italian literature.
- Boccaccios Leben und Werke (1880) – Boccaccio's life and work.
- Die Anfänge der Renaissancelitteratur in Italien (1882) – The beginnings of Renaissance literature in Italy.
- Encyklopädie und Methodologie der romanischen Philologie (1884–88) – Encyclopedia and methodology of Romance philology.
- Lateinisch-Romanisches Wörterbuch (third edition, 1907) – Latin-Romance dictionary.
- Grundriss der Geschichte der englischen Litteratur (1887; fifth edition, 1910) – Outline of the history of English literature.
- Formenlehre der französischen Sprache (1893–98) – Morphology of the French language.
