= Zierer (surname) =

Zierer, Ziehrer
Origin
- Language: German
- Region of origin: Germany, Austria

Other names
- Variant forms: Zier (Ziehr); Zierl (Zierl), Zierle, Zierlein; Zierold, Zierhold, Zierholz, Zierholtz; Zierfuß (Zierfuss); Ziernhöld, Zirnhöld, Ziernheld, Zirnheld; Zierhut, Zierhuth; Ziervogel, Ziervogl; Schmuck, Schmucker; Putzmann; Schön, Schönmann, Schönemann

Zierer, Ziehrer are German language surnames:

- Benno Zierer, multiple people
- Kilian Zierer (born 2000), German-born American football player
- Maria Zierer-Steinmüller(1895–1979)
- Otto Zierer (1909–1983), German writer

== Ziehrer ==
Ziehrer:

- Karl (Carl) Michael Ziehrer (1843–1922), an Austrian composer
  - List of dances and marches by Karl Michael Ziehrer
  - List of operettas by Karl Michael Ziehrer

== See also ==
- Zierer
