= Schmucker =

Schmucker or Schmücker is a German language surname. Notable people with the name include:

- Beale M. Schmucker (1827–1888), American Lutheran leader, liturgical scholar and historian
- František Schmucker (1940–2004), Czech football player
- John George Schmucker (1771–1854), German-American Lutheran clergyman
- Kurt Schmücker (1919–1996), German politician
- Peter Schmucker (1784–1860), American Methodist minister
- Samuel D. Schmucker (1844–1911), American jurist
- Samuel Mosheim Schmucker (1823–1863), American historical writer
- Samuel Simon Schmucker (1799–1873), German-American Lutheran pastor and theologian
