= Samuel Schmucker =

Samuel Schmucker may refer to:

- Samuel D. Schmucker (1844–1911), American jurist
- Samuel Mosheim Schmucker (1823–1863), American historical writer
- Samuel Simon Schmucker (1799–1873), German-American Lutheran pastor and theologian
- Samuel LeRoy Schmucker

(1977–), American filmmaker, actor, director
