= Luther Alexander Gotwald =

American Lutheran theologian and professor (1833–1900)

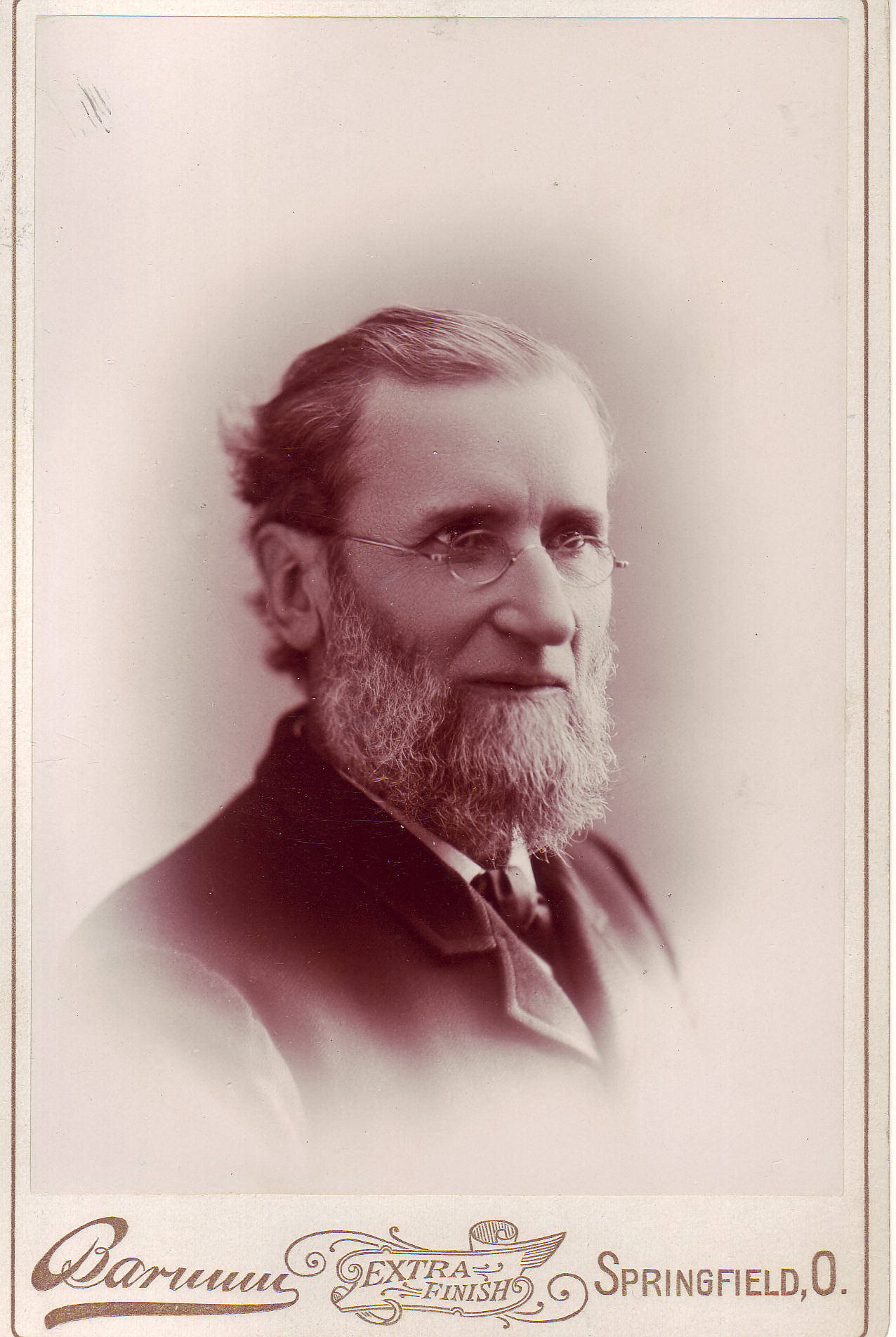
- Luther Alexander Gotwald, c. 1890
- Born: January 31, 1833; York Springs, Pennsylvania, U.S.
- Died: September 15, 1900 (aged 67); Springfield, Ohio, U.S.
- Burial place: Ferncliff Cemetery, Springfield, Ohio
- Education: Wittenberg College; Pennsylvania College; Gettysburg Seminary

Ecclesiastical career
- Religion: Lutheran
- Ordained: 1859
- Offices held: Professor of Practical and Historical Theology at Wittenberg Theological Seminary

Luther Alexander Gotwald, D.D. (January 31, 1833 – September 15, 1900) was an American Confessional Lutheran theologian and professor of Christian theology at the Wittenberg Theological Seminary in Springfield, Ohio. He was tried for heresy by the board of directors at the Wittenberg College in Springfield on April 4 and 5, 1893, which highlighted many key issues that American Lutherans still debate today. Gotwald died in 1900 in Springfield.

== Family ==
Gotwald was born in York Springs, Adams County, Pennsylvania, on January 31, 1833, the fifth child of seven brothers and five sisters. His parents were Lutheran minister Daniel Gotwald and his wife, Susannah (Krone) Gotwald, both natives of Pennsylvania and of German ancestry.

The elder Gotwald was a prominent minister of the Lutheran church and reportedly was "one of the most able and eloquent Lutheran ministers of his time". Daniel Gotwald was born in Manchester Township, York County, Pennsylvania, on December 16, 1793. Daniel's German immigrant parents were Andrew and Mary Magdalene Gottwald. Daniel was christened January 26, 1794, in Quickel's Church, Conewago Township, Pennsylvania. Daniel and Susannah were married on July 22, 1819, in York, Pennsylvania, by John George Schmucker, the then 48-year-old pastor of Christ Lutheran Church of York, and the father of famous Lutheran theologian and educator, Samuel Simon Schmucker. Daniel lived in York, where he worked as a carpenter, until the birth of his third child. In time, Daniel came to see himself as a very sinful man who was in great peril of "eternal death".

Alarmed and almost bereft of reason by the wretchedness of his mind, he sold his farm, quit his business, bought a small home, placed mother and her little family in it and then, on horseback, started off on a long journey, scarcely knowing or caring whither, only anxious in some way to relieve his mind of the terrible spiritual burden with which it was constantly oppressed. He was absent some months, having journeyed up into New York State, then out into Ohio, then back through Pennsylvania. But his religious convictions still clung to him. Nor could he, for a long time, find the rest he desired. Day and night, as mother has often informed me, did he wrestle and plead with God for mercy. Meeting after meeting, for prayer and religious services, did he attend, but still the burden of sin rested upon his soul. At last, however, he found all, and more than he sought. Near his home, out in a secluded field, was a tree, at the foot of which he had often agonised in prayer for mercy. That was his spiritual birthplace. There his Saviour met him, and spoke peace to his soul. There the burden was removed. There God, through Christ, was reconciled to him and there he received the sweet and blessed assurance of his adoption into the family of God.

Daniel began preaching on his own, drawing surprisingly large crowds. However, Rev. John George Schmucher approached Daniel and convinced him that he needed a formal education in Lutheranism. For a year and a half, Daniel walked five miles (8.0 km) every week through the very thick Penn's Woods to York to recite to the elder Schmucker. However, in time, this manner of instruction only whetted his taste for an even better education in the Lutheran ministry, so he sold his home and moved his family to Gettysburg to begin his full and regular course of theological study in the Lutheran Theological Seminary there as preparation for his work in the ministry. He studied there for two and a half years under the seminary's founder,. Samuel Simon Schmucker, who later said Daniel was "one of the most diligent and successful students that the Seminary ever had." Daniel Gotwald was among the first to graduate from Gettysburg Seminary.

Daniel had two pastorates, one in Adams County and one in Centre County, Pennsylvania. His pastorate in Centre County served sixteen churches, one being over 70 miles (110 km) away, which required him to be on the road much of the time. Daniel ardently supported the abolition of slavery in his ministry. Moreover, he fervently espoused the cause of temperance, which caused some to accuse him of being a "Methodist". Luther Gotwald gives this further description of his father's imposing physical characteristics, which undoubtedly served him well in his ministry:

In personal appearance, and physical qualities, my father was remarkable. He was six feet, two inches tall. He was straight as an arrow. His step was quick and firm. His movements were graceful and easy. His hair was raven black, his countenance sedate, almost severe. His complexion was dark. His eye was black and piercing. His lip was firm and expressive of great decision and determination. His whiskers were simply short, "Presbyterian" side whiskers. His dress was always specially neat and precise. He was a model of cleanliness, of industry, of activity, of precision and care in minute things, of honor and noble pride, of economy, and of all the manly graces and qualities which constitute a true Christian hero and gentleman.

Luther's father always preached in German, never in English. Luther Gotwald reported, in his own autobiography, as to his father's German language preaching that "As an orator and preacher he possessed great power. His voice was one of remarkable compass and sweetness. His thoughts logical and good, his imagination fine, his gestures graceful and wonderfully expressive, and his manner all earnestness, pathos, fire; his own soul all alive with the truth he was uttering, and his auditors held spell bound and weeping under his moving exaltations of truth and his powerful appeals." The elder Gotwald had a fiery temper, which his son, Luther said often caused his father great embarrassment and remorse. However, Luther went on to give this amusing account of the effect of his father's equally fiery eloquence in the pulpit, albeit in German.

Father always preached in German. When he was pastor at Petersburg, an Irishman, named Timmy McLaughlin, regularly attended his preaching, and annually paid $2.50 towards his support. One of the deacons, on one occasion, when Timmy paid over his annual subscription, asked him why it was that, although not able to understand a word of what Father said, he still so faithfully came to hear him, and also helped to support him. Timmy's reply was, "On faith, and it's worth it all sure just to see that elegant man's motions."

Luther's mother, Susannah Krone Gotwald, was a devout lady who taught her children her own deep piety and her own stern virtues. His mother could not read English, but read her German bible every day. She often went with her husband on his ministerial travels, but she always made her home in her native Pennsylvania. Luther Alexander Gotwald had seven brothers and five sisters. They were Eliza Ana, born March 5. 1820; George Andrew, born May 6, 1821; Sarah Anna, born November 13. 1822; George Andrew, born July 22, 1824; Leah, born January 1, 1826; Daniel Isaac, born November 21, 1827; Susan Caroline, born in 1830; Mary Catherine, born February 10. 1835; Washington Van Buren, born November 10, 1836; Jacob Henry, born October 6, 1838; and William Henry Harrison, born September 2, 1841. Four of their children died in childhood. George died at Liverpool, Pennsylvania, at the age of two, Sarah Anna died at Liverpool at the age of eleven months, Leah died June 7, 1826, at Liverpool at the age of six months, and Mary Catherine died at Aaronsburg on May 20, 1842, at the age of seven.

Luther's father died on March 11, 1843, in Aaronsburg at the age of 49, after an illness of some three months. He was buried in the Evangelical Lutheran Church yard at Aaronsburg. Daniel Gotwald's death left his wife of twenty-five years, Susannah, with their eight surviving children to bring up and with meager financial means to do it. He left her with only a modest home and a few acres of land.

Luther's older sister, Eliza, married Jacob Scherer of Aaronsburg in May 1845, when Luther was eleven years old. Scherer became the second Lutheran minister in the state of Illinois. He was born in Botetourt County, Virginia. He graduated from Pennsylvania College in 1841 as the valedictorian of his class and two years later from Gettysburg Seminary. He served his first pastorate at Indianapolis, Indiana, from 1843 until 1845. Scherer then had ministries at Wabash County, Illinois, at Olney, Illinois, and at Shelbyville, Illinois. He, with six other ministers, organized the Lutheran Synod of South West Virginia on September 20, 1841, at St. John's Church, Wythe County, Virginia. Scherer died near Shelbyville, Illinois, on October 15, 1851, while Luther was living as a guest in his home shortly before he left for Springfield, Ohio, to begin his studies at Wittenberg College. Eliza remarried a man with the same name as her later first husband, Jacob Scherer. He was actually a distant relative of her first husband. Perhaps predictably, there was no way this second husband could come up to her first one in Luther's estimation. To begin with, he was a farmer and not a clergyman. Luther describes him as "a kind husband, but a man of little culture and no energy." Eliza died in Hillsboro, Illinois, at the age of 41 on September 25, 1855. Luther said of her, "Eliza was a noble Christian women, a dutiful daughter, a kind sister, an affectionate wife, a loving mother, and a patient and self-denying Christian, willing to suffer the loss of all things."

Luther's brother George Andrew was a practicing physician in Slaterford, Pennsylvania. However, Luther still considered him to be the black sheep of the family. He reports that "For many years he was no Christian." But then, Luther continues with great relief that "when forty one years of age, he professed to give his heart to God, and has ever since lived a consistent Christian life." Luther attributes this great miracle to his "pious mother", who prayed every day for forty years for that conversion and her son's resultant salvation. George was married to Lizzie Rolinsen, of New Harmony, Posey County, Indiana, whom Luther pronounced to be "an excellent Christian woman".

Strangely, Luther does not seem to have known much about his older brother, Daniel Isaac Gotwald. He was a printer who died in Cincinnati, Ohio, in 1849 when he was 21. Luther says of him that "He was, I think, noble and upright in all his deportment, respectful and happy in his disposition, and a genial favorite among all who knew him. At the time of his death, several of the Cincinnati papers spoke very favorably of him." Luther admits that he does not even know whether Daniel Isaac was a Christian but continued that "Fervently do I hope that he was, for it is a dreadful thought that any of those we love, and especially one so dear as a Brother, should be called unprepared, from time into eternity, there to suffer forever for the misdeeds of this life."

Gotwald's brother, Washington Van Buren Gotwald, was a Lutheran minister in Lancaster, Pennsylvania. He attended Pennsylvania College, from which he graduated in 1860. He served for one year as tutor in the Preparatory Department at Gettysburg. He was a member of the Philo Literary Society and of Phi Gamma Delta fraternity. After a two-year course in the theological seminary, he was ordained by the Pennsylvania Synod at its meeting in 1862 at Reading. He served first for four years as minister at Emmitsburg, Maryland. In 1866, he became the minister of St. John's Lutheran Church at Lancaster, Pennsylvania. His work in both of these ministries was widely praised. He died at Lancaster on June 10, 1869.

Luther's younger brother, William Henry Harrison Gotwald, also became a Lutheran minister. His wife was Annie C. Murray. He attended the public school during the winter and worked on a farm during the summer until he was eighteen. He attended the Aaronsburg Academy and prepared himself for college. He entered Pennsylvania College in 1861, but his education was interrupted by the Civil War. After the Civil War, he re-enrolled in Pennsylvania College and graduated from there in 1866. In the fall of that year, he became principal of the Aaronsburg Academy and continued as its principal for two years. Luther proudly notes that "It was during his Principalship that this Academy had a larger number of students in attendance than at any other time either before or since." William was ordained in the Lutheran ministry in 1868. His first ministry was at Loganton, Pennsylvania, which had been a part of his father's last charge. During his career in the Lutheran ministry, he served several churches and held a variety of offices in the Lutheran Church. In April 1873 became pastor to the Lutheran Church at Milton, Pennsylvania, and continued as its pastor for nearly fifteen years, when he had to resign due to bronchial troubles. While he was serving as pastor at Milton, he was also president of the Susquehanna Synod for three years and chairman of the Examining Committee for many years. He served as a member of the Milton School Board for twelve years, being its president for three years. He was the originator and organizer of the Pennsylvania State School Directors' Association and was its president for three years. He was a delegate to the General Synod and director of the Theological Seminary at Gettysburg. He served as a Presbyterian minister in Ocala, Florida, where he had gone due to his health. However, he built a Lutheran church at Martin, Florida. He organized the St. Mark's Evangelical Lutheran Church in Washington, D. C., and served as its pastor until June 1897. He died on March 12, 1921.

Luther's younger brother, Jacob Henry Gotwald, was a respected surgeon, who died at sea close to Charleston, South Carolina, at the age of 24 during the Civil War (discussed below).

Susan Crone Gotwald, who survived her husband by 44 years, died in her sleep on July 17, 1881, in Aaronsburg, Centre County, Pennsylvania. Gotwald said this of his mother in his autobiography.

She was, indeed, a true Christian, a faithful wife, an affectionate mother, and, in all respects as pure and gentle and lovely a Christian character as I have ever known. She was a woman of great energy and force and will. She shrank from doing nothing that she felt ought to be done.

When my father died, she was left with eight children, and no means of support, except the house in which she lived, and a few acres of land. But, through her economy and energy, she, in some way, managed, with God's blessing, to raise us and raise us well. She was a woman that, above all other women that I have ever known, and the power of governing children. Her government over us was mild, but very positive and firm. She ruled us more by love than by threats and punishments, and yet, she sometimes did punish, and, when she did, she did so severely. But she never did it in haste or anger. Her plan generally was to take us into "the back room," and first calmly and tenderly talk to us, and show us our wrong, and how it wounded her, and how such conduct was especially displeasing to God. Generally also she would kneel in prayer with us. And then she would whip us and do it thoroughly. But, I would always much rather take Mother's whippings, than her talks and prayers and was always glad when the time to whip had come. They hurt me less than her kind and tearful words of previous rebuke, and especially than her prayers. She was a woman of much prayer. She daily maintained family worship, which she always conducted herself in the German language. And she was also often and much engaged in secret prayer, we children frequently over hearing her whilst she was thus engaged. And this, no doubt, was the source of her comfort and strength during all her many years of widowhood, poverty, bereavement and trial of every kind. For God's promise is "Ask and ye shall receive."

She was, indeed, a true Christian, a faithful wife, an affectionate mother, and, in all respects as pure and gentle and lovely a Christian character as I have ever known. She was a woman of great energy and force and will. She shrank from doing nothing that she felt ought to be done.

== Early life and education ==
Luther Alexander Gotwald was baptized by Samuel Simon Schmucker, who was a great friend of his father and who had come to Petersburg to assist his father at a communion season. He lived most of his younger days in Petersburg, now Littlestown, Pennsylvania. Gotwald said this of his native town of Petersburg in his autobiography:

I was born into this world on the 31st day of January in the year 1833 in Petersburg or York Springs in Adams County, Pennsylvania. The town was a small bit of a place then, and is still small, but it is a capital place for all that. It is healthy, it has good society, and it especially has always been distinguished for its excellent morals. An almost Puritanic moral and religious serenity characterized it in my childhood days, and whilst in this respect it has, no doubt, somewhat relaxed and learned to know that religion does not consist in inflexible adherence or obedience to an iron code of rules, it has not, as is today the case so generally throughout almost the whole of Puritan New England, swung off into the opposite extremes or excess of irreligion and of every species of immorality. I have been back to the dear little town repeatedly since I am a man and must say that I like the type and ring of its social and religious life as much as that of any place I know.

Gotwald undertook his early studies at an academy near his home of which, as an adult, he admitted to remembering little. At the age of ten, he went to work as a clerk and errand boy in various stores to help support his family. He also worked as a carpenter and a carriage maker. However, Luther later wrote, "my desires for further education prevented me from so concentrating my mind at these trades as to make a success of them. I remember keeping books in the drawer of my work bench and at every spare moment, I would take occasion to read from them. In fact, my employer said that my mind was so set on the books that I managed to spoil more lumber than I was worth and I was discharged." His sister, Eliza lived "out west", so he decided to follow her. Of this move, he reports.

In the year 1849 I decided to go West for work and as my sister [Eliza] lived in Illinois. I was naturally inclined in that direction. On this journey I was nearly drowned in a heavy storm on Lake Erie. After arriving at my destination, I worked at various forms of manual work in field and garden. I also worked at the printer's trade in both Chicago and in Freeport, Illinois. At the latter place, I was cheated out of all the hard earned wages which I had saved from my labors in the cornfield, leaving me with only $3.50. From Freeport, I worked my way to Galena, Illinois, where I took boat for St. Louis. In this city I worked for various news papers. From St. Louis I went to Shelbyville, Illinois, where my sister Eliza, Mrs. Rev. Jacob Scherer, lived. There I obtained employment in the cornfields. I was present at the time of the death of my sister's husband, Rev. Jacob Scherer, at the age of 35, in the Fall of 1851.

In the spring of 1851 and at the age of 19, Luther Gotwald entered Wittenberg College, a Lutheran college in Springfield, Ohio, in the Preparatory Department. He only had fourteen dollars when he arrived and he had to work to pay his way. He remained at Wittenberg until his sophomore year. There is a book written by his Lutheran cleric great-grandson, Luther A. Gotwald Jr, entitled The Gotwald Trial Revisited (the "Gotwald heresy trial book" for short). The book states that Gotwald took up with college sweetheart Mary Elizabeth King, who was fifteen years old at the time. Gotwald met King through her brothers. She had three brothers, David King Jr., Robert Quigley King and Samuel Noble King, who were his classmates at Wittenberg. The Gotwald heresy book notes that the King family was sufficiently wealthy to send all three of them to college at the same time. Not only that, the King family lived close enough to the Wittenberg campus that they were able to walk to class. However, Luther became so infatuated with her that his family feared it would adversely affect his studies. So, they pulled him out of Wittenberg and sent him to Pennsylvania where he continued his studies in Lutheran theology. In 1855 he entered Pennsylvania College at Gettysburg, from which he graduated with honors in 1857. Next he entered the Theological Seminary of Gettysburg and after taking a two-year course graduated from that institution in 1859. The Lutheran Synod of West Pennsylvania ordained Luther Alexander Gotwald at Waynesboro, Pennsylvania. A year later the same synod licensed him to preach.

== Marriage ==
Once he had completed his studies and newly ordained, he made haste to return to Springfield to marry Mary Elizabeth King. They married, on October 13, 1859, in her home the "King Homestead" at 2 Ferncliff Place, Springfield, Ohio (today the Chi Omega sorority house of Wittenberg University). King was born April 1, 1837, in Tarlton, Ohio. She was the daughter of David and Almena (Caldwell) King. Her father, David King was probably born in Baltimore, Maryland. Her mother, Almena Caldwell King, was born in Hillsborough, New Hampshire, on August 16, 1809. However, she moved with her parents when she was young to early Portsmouth, Ohio, which is in southernmost Ohio at the confluence of the Scioto River and the Ohio River, where her father established a successful carpentry business. Both of Mary's parents had been orphans. Her father, David King, was found as a toddler wandering the streets of Baltimore during a yellow fever epidemic in which both his parents presumably died. David knew only his own name and could tell nothing about his parents. He was found in a Baltimore hotel and taken in by a Robert Quigley who had a farm near Shippensburg, Pennsylvania, who reared and educated him. As a child, David King attended the Middle Spring Presbyterian Church, near Shippensburg, with the Quigleys, whereby he became a lifelong Presbyterian and, as result, he brought up his own family as Presbyterians.

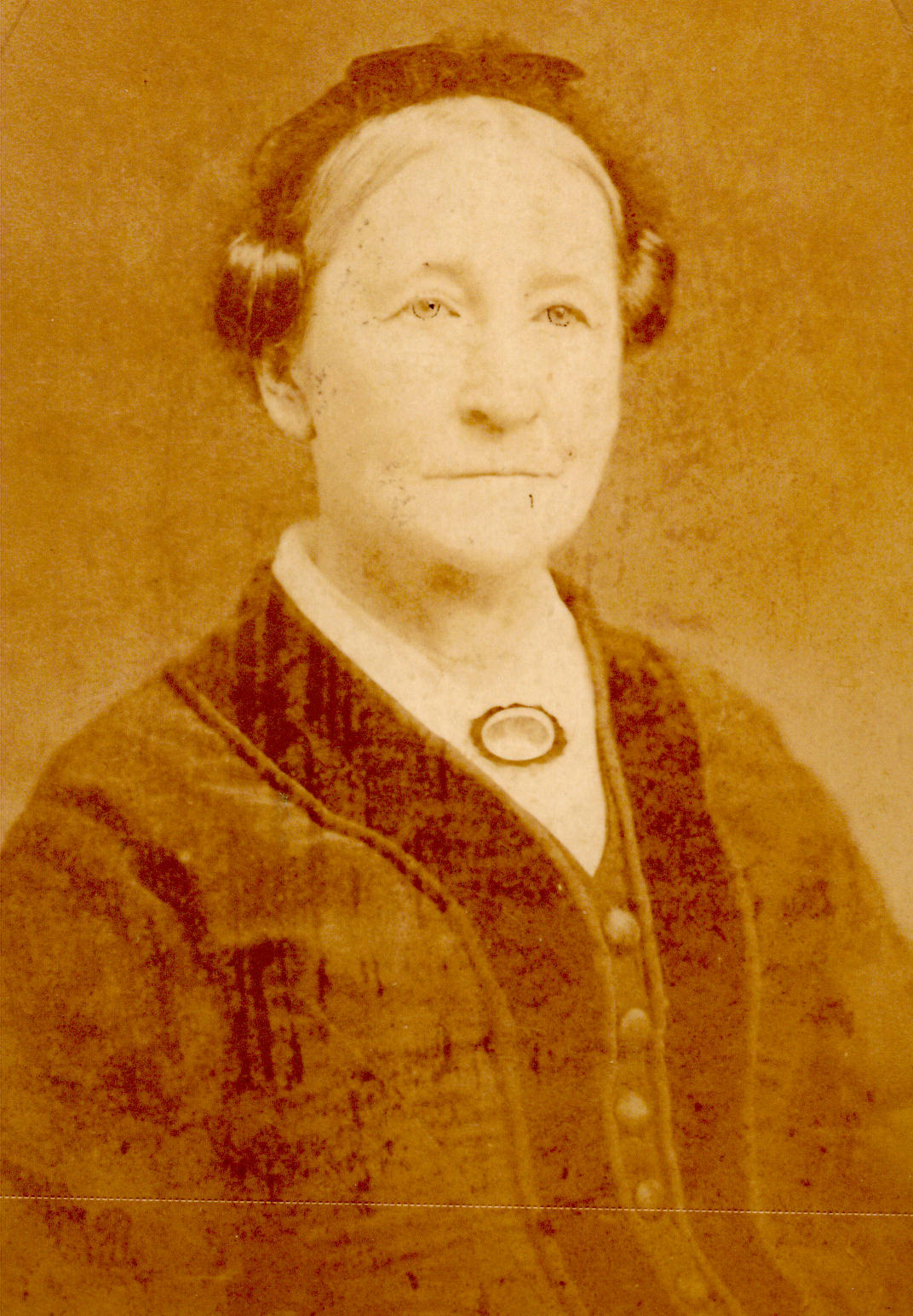
Almena Caldwell King, Mary Gotwald's mother

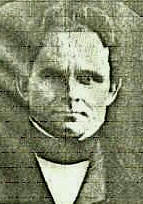
David King, Mary Gotwald's father

Upon attaining adulthood, David King obtained an apprenticeship as a store clerk in Portsmouth, Ohio, where he met teenage Almena Caldwell. Her older brother and father fell from a small boat and drowned in the nearby Scioto River. Soon thereafter, Almena's mother died. Her uncle Hannibal Gilman Hamlin (first cousin to Lincoln's first Vice President, Hannibal Hamlin) became the guardian of her and her brother, Hamlin Caldwell, moved them to Cincinnati and saw to their education. David King married her there when she was seventeen. Gotwald wrote a biography of his parents-in-law in which he pointed out sternly that Almena was too young to marry at seventeen. The Kings moved to Tarlton, Ohio, where they opened a general store. Several of Robert Quigley's (her father's foster father) grandchildren moved to Springfield, Ohio. So, David and Almena King moved there as well in 1840. David proceeded to build a significant portion of early downtown Springfield, which was known for long thereafter as "King's Row". David King died on August 8, 1849, in a cholera epidemic, which he contracted while caring for other victims of the outbreak. According to the Gotwald heresy book, Almena built the Ferncliff Place homestead (which was out in the country when built) to get her boys away from the bars near their home in Springfield proper.

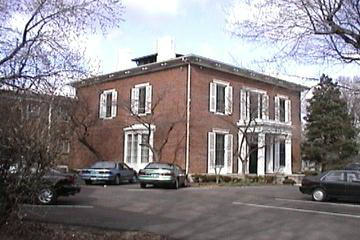
The "King Homestead" at 2 Ferncliff Place in Springfield, Ohio, is now the Chi Omega Sorority House of Wittenberg University.

Mary King Gotwald was lavishly praised in the Gotwald heresy trial book as a perfect minister's wife. Her obituary added in this respect that "Mrs. Gotwald was always interested in church activities. She was also active in missionary development in the Lutheran church at large." Luther and Mary King Gotwald had nine children: seven sons and two daughters who were named, respectively, David King Gotwald, who was born October 31, 1860, Shippensburg, Pennsylvania; George Daniel Gotwald, who was born September 18, 1862, in Shippensburg, Pennsylvania; Robert Caldwell Gotwald, who was born September 25, 1864, in Lebanon, Pennsylvania; Luther Alexander Gotwald Jr., who was born October 26, 1866, in Dayton, Ohio, but who died young on July 11, 1881; Frederick Gebhart Gotwald, who was born May 11, 1869, in Aaronsburg, Pennsylvania; William Washington Gotwald, who was born June 2, 1871, in Chambersburg, Pennsylvania, and who died young on May 2, 1888; Charles Hamlin Gotwald, who was born August 25, 1874, in York, Pennsylvania, and died in infancy on July 12, 1875; Almena Gotwald, who was born June 29, 1876, in York, Pennsylvania; and, Mary Susan Gotwald; who was born August 2, 1879, in York, Pennsylvania.

Luther says of his deceased son, Charles Hamlin Gotwald, "he was ever a frail, delicate child and was not destined to live long. . . . In the summer of 1875 he was brought to Springfield, Ohio, on a visit and died there at the home of his grandmother [Almena Caldwell King] on Monday, July 12, 1875. He was buried in the family lot in Ferncliff Cemetery.

Luther says of his deceased son, Luther Alexander Gotwald Jr., "His death was due to lock jaw, resulting from accidentally jumping on an iron rake while playing in Leber's yard, South Beaver Street, York, Pennsylvania, a week before, July 4, 1881. His early education was received at the York County Academy and he was examined and ready to enter the Freshman Class at Pennsylvania College the following September. . . He was buried in the family lot at Springfield, Ohio, Ferncliff Cemetery. The funeral at York was attended by the Sunday School in a body and by his fellow students of the Academy in a body.

Of his deceased son, William Washington Gotwald, Luther writes:

His early education was received at the York County Academy, York, Pennsylvania, where he prepared himself for College. In December 1885 he entered the Freshman Class of Wittenberg College and was a Junior when he died May 2nd 1888 after a protracted case of typhoid fever. . . He possessed an unusually strong, clear and mature mind and ranked high in his class. He had decided to study for the Lutheran ministry, and if practicable, to go as a missionary to Africa. His death was the first to occur at Wittenberg since 1857. It produced profound sorrow among his fellow students, professors and friends in the Second Lutheran Church and in the city. The funeral was one of the largest ever held in the city. Addresses were made by Dr. J. B. Helwig of First Lutheran Church and Dr. S. A. Ort and Rev. E. L. Fleck of the Third Lutheran Church. Resolutions of esteem and sympathy were adopted by Alpha Psi chapter of Alpha Tau Omega fraternity, Ohio Beta chapter of Phi Kappa Psi fraternity, the Y.M.C.A. of the city, the Second Lutheran Church, the Class of 1889 and the Excelsior Literary Society. He was buried in the family lot at Ferncliff Cemetery beside his brothers, Charles Hamlin and Luther Alexander, Jr., on the 4th of May 1888.

Mary Gotwald's mother, Almena Caldwell King, died of diabetes on May 30, 1878. Luther Gotwald had been out West on church business and stopped in Springfield on his return train trip to find Almena on her death bed. He immediately telegraphed for Mary to come by train. He was at Almena's side when she died and was undoubtedly a great comfort to her. Unfortunately, Mary was unable to arrive until the next day. After Almena's death, various family members, including Mary's unmarried sister, Sarah Jane King, lived in the King homestead. When Luther and Mary Gotwald first returned to Springfield to serve as a minister, they first lived in the parsonage of his church. However, when he became a professor at Wittenburg, they moved into the King homestead on Ferncliff Place with Sarah Jane King, whom he called in his David King biography "one of the sweetest and best 'Old Maids' that the world has ever had". They continued to live in the King homestead for the rest of their lives. They were living there at the time that Luther's famous heresy trial took place at nearby Wittenberg College.

== Lutheran Church ==
Gotwald's first ministry was in Shippensburg, Pennsylvania, where he remained until 1863. The Gotwald heresy trial book states that, during this ministry in Shippensburg, his wife Mary was able to thoroughly enjoy living among members of the Quigley family, who had brought up her orphan father and after whom her brother, Robert Quigley King was named. Gotwald then became the pastor in Lebanon, Pennsylvania, for two years, where he preached until 1865. He went from Lebanon in 1865 to serve as the pastor to the First Lutheran Church at Dayton, Ohio, where he remained until 1869, when he had to resign his ministry because of throat problems, which forced him to take a year off from the ministry to recuperate. In October 1870, Gotwald had recovered and was able to assume the ministry at the Lutheran Church in Chambersburg, Pennsylvania, where he preached until 1874. Gotwald received his honorary degree of Doctor of Divinity from Pennsylvania College in 1874, some fifteen years after completing his initial studies. Afterward, for nearly twelve years he was pastor of Saint Paul's English Lutheran Church in York, Pennsylvania. In December 1885, he returned to Springfield and became pastor of the Second Lutheran Church there for three years, which was to be his last pastorate. In December 1888, he was elected to the Professorship of Practical and Historical Theology in the Wittenberg Theological Seminary in Springfield.

Gotwald made many intellectual contributions to the Lutheran church during his long service to it. He was a frequent contributor to the Quarterly Review of the Lutheran Church, published at Gettysburg, and wrote various other papers and periodicals, including a number of pamphlets on historic and ecclesiastical subjects. Two volumes of his sermons were published, which were widely praised. He also authored his 1879 learned work, Church Orders: Of the Necessity of a Right Call to the Ministry.

Gotwald served as a director of Wittenberg College from 1865 until 1869, a trustee of Pennsylvania College from 1873 until 1885, a director of the Gettysburg Theological Seminary from 1871 until 1880, a member of the board of Lutheran Home Missions from 1881 until 1885, president of the West Pennsylvania Synod from 1873 until 1876 and a member of the Board of Church Extension from 1874 until 1885. He was often a delegate to the Lutheran General Synod.

He helped found the Third Lutheran Church in Springfield in 1887. In Springfield, he later helped found the Fifth Lutheran Church in 1891, the Fourth Lutheran Church in 1898, and the Calvary Lutheran Church in 1900.

== Civil War ==
Gotwald was a stanch Lincoln Republican and, during the American Civil War, he was a strong Union man. He did all he could to further the interests of the Union cause. To illustrate Gotwald's feeling toward slavery, his autobiography reports this incident from his youth:

Among the reminiscences of that very early portion of my life is one that made a deep and terrible impression upon me, and which, later in my life, I came to understand far better than I did then. I refer to the kidnapping of a poor black man who had escaped from slavery somewhere in the South, and who was fleeing north and in search of freedom. If my memory serves me rightly, it occurred on a Sunday afternoon, and the only thing I distinctly recollect was my sitting on our front porch sobbing and crying with breaking heart over the hellish outrage and wrong of the act, and, child as I was, I remember that I felt that it was inexpressibly mean and cowardly in us all to see that poor black man helpless in the hands of his brutal captors and run back again into the terrible life of slavery without putting forth a single effort to assist and deliver him. My blood even now boils with indignation over the wrongs inflicted in the past by this hell born demon of slavery, and, more indignant yet I become when I recall the base and truculent spirit of the South which coldly, for the mere sake of peace and mercenary gain allowed and connived at it all! But God has avenged the wrongs of the oppressed. Slavery in our land is among the things that are past. And for their sin in connection with this great evil both the North and South have been baptized with a very baptism of blood, and the whole land has been scourged with the besom of destruction! Thank God that Slavery has gone down, even though it did go down, and could perhaps only go down, in blood and war and fire and the very death throes of the nation!

Lutheran minister Abraham Essick writes in his diary that he bumped into Gotwald on May 8, 1861, at the train depot in Harrisburg, Pennsylvania (right after the April 13, 1861, fall of Fort Sumter), who was taking his family to Springfield, Ohio, to leave them there (without doubt at the King homestead, with his mother in law, Almena Caldwell King), while he joined the Union Army to serve as a chaplain or even a private. Gotwald did not so serve. While apparently not formally enlisted in the Union Army, he did serve as the chaplain for a group of Shippensburg soldiers who were getting ready to go off to war. This ended in March 1863, when he assumed a parish in Lebanon, Pennsylvania. There were many Confederate sympathizers in Lebanon, so Gotwald's support of the Union cause was not popular with all his parishioners. When the Confederate Army invaded the North in June 1863, he moved his family to safety with his mother, who lived in Aaronsburg, Pennsylvania.

Luther's brother, Jacob H. Gotwald, was the chief surgeon on board the ship Keystone State under the command of Rear-Admiral Samuel Francis Du Pont in the fight at Charleston, South Carolina. His ship was participating in the blockade of Charleston Harbor, when, on January 31, 1863, a Confederate shell hit the ship's boiler, causing it to explode and kill several of its crew. Jacob H. Gotwald was scalded to death while rendering surgical aid to one of the wounded men. He was found still clutching the bandage.

Luther's younger brother, Washington Van Buren Gotwald, was a theological student at the Gettysburg Seminary at the time of the Battle of Gettysburg and actually got caught up in the prelude to the battle.

The residents of Gettysburg needed no official notification to inform them of the proximity of the opposing army. In the large clearings dotting the eastern slope of South Mountain, the camp fires of Southern troops were clearly visible. There were also constant rumors of Rebel foraging parties roaming the surrounding countryside.

Therefore, it was with much trepidation that Martin Luther Culler and Washington Van Buren Gotwald accepted a request by the pastor of the Emmitsburg charge for two Gettysburg Seminary students to fill the pulpit at Fairfield, Pennsylvania, for the morning and evening services scheduled for Sunday, June 28th. The village of Fairfield was located near a gap in South Mountain only ten miles south of Cashtown. During the journey it was decided that Gotwald would preach in the morning, since he was senior to Culler in both age and years of study at the seminary.

Near the close of the morning service, a contingent of Confederates dashed into the village, greatly frightening the citizens, who did not hang around for the benediction. The curiosity of the students was greatly aroused, however, and in the early afternoon they walked toward the Rebel camp on the outskirts of the town for a closer look. From a respectful distance, they cautiously observed the Southerners. Suddenly, two Union scouts rode up and halted nearby. The Yankees took cover behind a hedgerow, discharged their carbines at the enemy troops, and dashed away unobserved. The Confederates immediately returned fire in the direction of the rising white smoke. The bullets passed dangerously close to the students and the pair immediately scampered into a nearby house. A moment later, an angry group of Southern soldiers burst through the door, thrusting their weapons into the faces of the suspected gunmen. The prisoners were marched out of the house where they were met by the Rebel captain. Gotwald, visibly shaken by the experience, was speechless. Conversely, his companion maintained his composure. After respectfully saluting the officer, Culler earnestly narrated the true sequence of events and the mistaken identity which had occurred in the midst of the confusion. The captain admitted that the story seemed plausible, but he did not appear entirely convinced of the innocence of the two young men. A painful silence followed.

Acting decisively, Culler cleverly turned the tables on his interrogator. "Captain, you do not arrest men of the gospel, do you?" He asked forcefully. The surprised captain immediately queried, "Are you men ministers?" In replying in the affirmative, the Seminarian did not believe he had told an egregious lie. They were, after all, ministerial students, and they had indeed come preaching.

Feeling more at ease with the polite officer, Martin pointed to the Lutheran church and stated: "Do you see that brick church yonder? There we were holding religious service this morning. This man you see with me was preaching. Your men rushed into town and this hinders me from preaching the splendid sermon which I intended to preach this evening.

The captain smiled and replied that he did not arrest ministers of the gospel unless they were bearing arms. He then inquired into the quality of the horse they had ridden into town on. "It is old, blind and poor in flesh", Culler answered. "We are Yankee enough to know better than to venture anywhere near your army with a good horse." The officer laughed heartily and assured the "ministers" they could return home undisturbed on such a specimen. Later, Culler conceded that the Fairfield congregation did not "lose much" in missing his sermon.

Luther's brother William Henry Harrison Gotwald suspended his studies for the ministry and joined the Union Army. He served at the headquarters at Camp Curtin, near Harrisburg, Pennsylvania, during the war. The Civil War brought a family to the King homestead in Springfield, Ohio, for the duration. Mary King Gotwald's father, David King, had staked his brother-in-law, Hamlin Caldwell, to a cotton business, which flourished, in booming Scottsboro, Alabama. He married Southern belle Martha Jane Snodgrass, started a family, and even owned slaves. However, when the Civil War began, his New Hampshire roots won out, which placed his sympathies with the North, making him a "damyankee" and not for secession. Those sentiments, plus his family kinship to then vice president and ardent abolitionist Hannibal Hamlin, from whose family he took his first name, made his position in Scottsboro untenable and forced him to flee to the North with his family. However, his 16-year-old son, David King Caldwell, had been reared in the South and was every bit the southerner. He ran away and attempted to enlist in the Confederate Army; his father prevailed upon his brother-in-law, Confederate Colonel John Snodgrass, to reject his enlistment and send him back to his family, which he did, to the utter humiliation of young David. Hamlin Caldwell then weathered the Civil War with his sister, Almena Caldwell King, in the King Homestead in Springfield. His southern wife, Martha Jane, lost a child while living in Springfield; her mental condition deteriorated greatly during her stay there, and she remained mentally incompetent for the rest of her life. David King Caldwell attended Wittenberg College while they were in Springfield. After the war, the family promptly returned to Scottsboro, where they stayed and prospered.

Gotwald's brother-in-law, David King Jr, served as a lieutenant colonel in the Union Army and actively fought in many major battles, including the Battle of Lookout Mountain in Chattanooga, Tennessee. King was for many years after the war the Grand Marshal of the Springfield Memorial Day parade. Gotwald's brother-in-law Samuel Noble King enlisted in the Union Army as a private, but earned a battlefield promotion to lieutenant and ended the war as a captain in the Union Army. Gotwald's sister-in-law Sarah Jane (Jennie) King was active in the Sanitary Society (which promoted better sanitary conditions for Union soldiers) in Springfield during the war.

== Heresy trial ==
Gotwald was tried for heresy by the board of trustees at Wittenberg College in Springfield, Ohio, on April 4 and April 5, 1893. In his book The Gotwald Trial Revisited, Luther A. Gotwald Jr tells the story of this trial in detail, and why and how his ancestor was tried for heresy on a charge of "false teachings". This charge was brought by three members of the First Lutheran Church of Dayton, Ohio, who were members of the Wittenberg Board of Trustees. These board members alleged that his teachings espoused the doctrine of the General Council denomination of the Lutheran Church.

The author states that "As unusual as it is for a theological professor to have such charges preferred against him, what is even more unusual is the fact that the two competing denominations were making overtures toward closer cooperation with hopes of their eventual merger." According to A History of Wittenberg College, "the 'trial' of Professor L. A. Gotwald at Wittenberg, in 1893, arose from fear that the liberal traditions of the college were threatened by a rising 'exclusive and conservative spirit' symbolized by Gotwald." As the Gotwald heresy trial book put it, "The 1890s were times when Lutheran were choosing between two identities—Lutherans who were adapting their teachings and practices to Protestant America following the lead of Dr. Samuel Simon Schmucker; and those who sought their role as maintaining the understandings of the Lutheranism of the 16th-century Reformer Martin Luther. Both sides maintained they were true." Gotwald was defended at this trial by Judge Joseph W. Adair of Noble County, Indiana. At the conclusion of the trial, even the prosecutors joined in the unanimous vote for his acquittal.

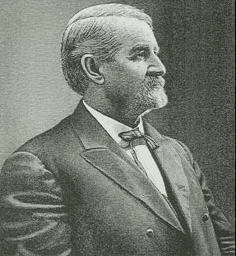
Judge Joseph W. Adair, defense attorney for Prof. Gotwald

The charges that Gotwald was not teaching correct Lutheran theology had swirled around quite some time before formal charges were brought to the Wittenberg Board of Trustees. It undoubtedly owed much of its genesis to Gotwald's ministry in Dayton in which he became embroiled in many stormy debates about church doctrine with some other church leaders. It reached the point that his health gave out and he had to resign his ministry and spend a period of time away from the ministry to recover. It was no coincidence that his most vocal critics and accusers came from Dayton. Perhaps most damaging in the leadup to the trial were articles in the Lutheran Evangelist that named "Luther Gotwald as a teacher not fit to teach in a General Synod Seminary."

A minority of the Wittenberg board of directors, consisting of Ernest E. Baker, Alexander Gebhart, and Joseph R. Gebhart, sent a minority report to the Miami Synod Convention, which was held in Springfield on October 5 through October 7, 1892, requesting that it investigate whether Gotwald "gloried in the idea that the logical interpretation of the Augsburg Confession, i.e., orthodox Lutheranism] would lead to the doctrinal basis of the general council (i.e., unorthodox and, at the time, actively competing Lutheranism)". The board of directors, after lengthy debate, pointedly supported all their faculty of their seminary. Further, a majority of the Wittenberg board of directors had little heart to hear the heresy charges against Gotwald. In fact, the Wittenberg board of directors as well as the Miami Synod Convention passed on the chance to act on the charges brought by this minority of the Wittenberg board of directors. Some Wittenberg Theological Seminary faculty members even tried to talk the accusers out of their intention to take action against Gotwald.

Even so, these accusations motivated Gotwald to assure the Wittenberg board of directors in writing on October 31, 1892, that he had "never contemplated a change in the doctrinal basis of the General Synod". His assurance included a list of the theological positions he accepted and those he rejected. He requested the opportunity to go before the board and make this assurance in person. However, at this point, the president of the board saw no need, after their lengthy discussion at their regular meeting, to call a special meeting to deal with what it seemed to consider frivolous accusations.

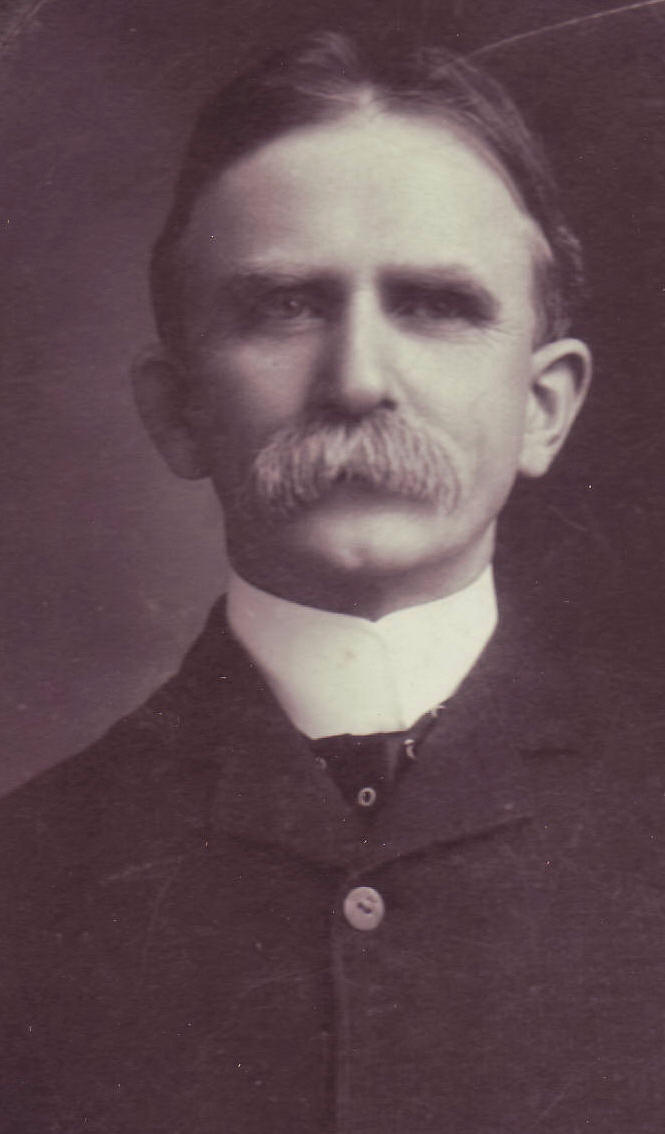
Attorney John Luther Zimmerman, board chair

The Gotwald heresy trial book states that "the three rebuffed accusers from Dayton were determined all the more to bring the matter to the Wittenberg Board of Directors for final resolution in a formal heresy trial in the Spring of 1893." Thus, these detractors continued to argue that while Gotwald started with orthodox Lutheran doctrine, his interpretation of that doctrine and his teaching, based on his logical extension of that doctrine, ended up in unorthodox beliefs and teachings. The persons who formally brought charges against Gotwald before the directors of Wittenberg College were, of course, his arch detractors, Ernest E. Baker, Alexander Gebhart and Joseph R. Gebhart. They based their charges on what they said he had said to them personally, what he had said at various Lutheran functions, and even what had been written about him in his biography in a Lutheran publication as to what he believed himself and as to what he intended to teach his students. The Gotwald heresy trail book says that professor of English and Latin, Charles Lewis Ehrenfeld, was also heavily involved behind the scenes in the drafting of charges against Gotwald. Ehrenfeld had recently survived a student request to the Wittenberg board of directors that he be dismissed, but still had resigned from Wittenberg as a result. The charges, as initially filed, were that "The said Luther A. Gotwald, D.D. is DISQUALIFIED to be a Professor of Theology in Wittenberg College". They included a list of seven charges, all of which probably may be summed in the charge that he was not teaching "the type of Lutheranism that dictated the establishment of Wittenberg College, that animated its founders in undertaking it, and in whose interests the original trust was created." Under Board rules, the filing of these formal charges required Board President John Luther Zimmerman to call a special board meeting to hear evidence regarding those accusations. He called that meeting to begin at 2:00 p.m. on April 4, 1893, in the Wittenberg Recitation Hall, in the College Building on the Wittenberg campus. The accusing board members persuaded a reluctant board member, Rev. E. D. Smith, to serve as the initial prosecutor. Judge Joseph W. Adair and pastor G.M. Grau, represented the defense.

At the outset of the trial, the defense moved that the charges be made more specific. The board required the prosecution to do so. There was much heated argument over what those specifics should be. When the board finally adopted the amended charges to be tried, "the accusers refused to bring the amended charges claiming that the altered charges were not their charges". The original prosecutor, E. D. Smith, also declined to continue, since the amended charges were not those that he had agreed to prosecute. Board member M. J. Firey reluctantly agreed to continue the prosecution of the case against Gotwald on the amended charges. Firey had little luck in prosecuting the case, since the original accusers all steadfastly refused to participate in any way and, unlike in a regular court of law, he had no way to force their testimony. All the rest of the testimony he called at the trial from fellow faculty members and even a student was basically supportive of Gotwald. With no help from the instigators of the charges, Firey could not make his case. The trial ended abruptly in acquittal, before Gotwald had presented the bulk of his defense – apparently to his great disappointment. Twenty five court members voted to acquit, including prosecutors Firey and Smith. His three accusers, Ernest E. Baker, Alexander Gebhart, and Joseph R. Gebhart, abstained from the vote. Wittenberg later published and distributed Gotwald's unpresented defense to the unclear charges.

Still, his accusers later stated in The Lutheran Evangelist that the proceeding against Gotwald had been a "mock trial". They even threatened to appeal the outcome to the Ohio Supreme Court, but of course they could not appeal the outcome of a church trial to a secular court.

Following the trial, and at least in partial response to the publicity attending it, the General Synod at Canton and the general counsel of Fort Wayne, Indiana, made large steps in resolving the differences between them. The General Synod and the General Council joined into the United Lutheran Church in America on November 15, 1918, in New York City. John L. Zimmerman, who presided at the Gotwald trial, was elected to its executive board.

Even so, as is true with virtually all major denominations, the debate between the conservative and liberal persuasions of the Lutheran Church continues today. As the Gotwald heresy trial book puts it, in "the Twenty-first Century, in the wake of the ecumenical movement, Lutherans are again being challenged to identify their reasons for being and knowing their true identity. Readers will find many of the same issues which dominated the trial of Luther Gotwald are still with us today, making it a good reason for becoming acquainted with its issues and how they were dealt with."

== Later life ==
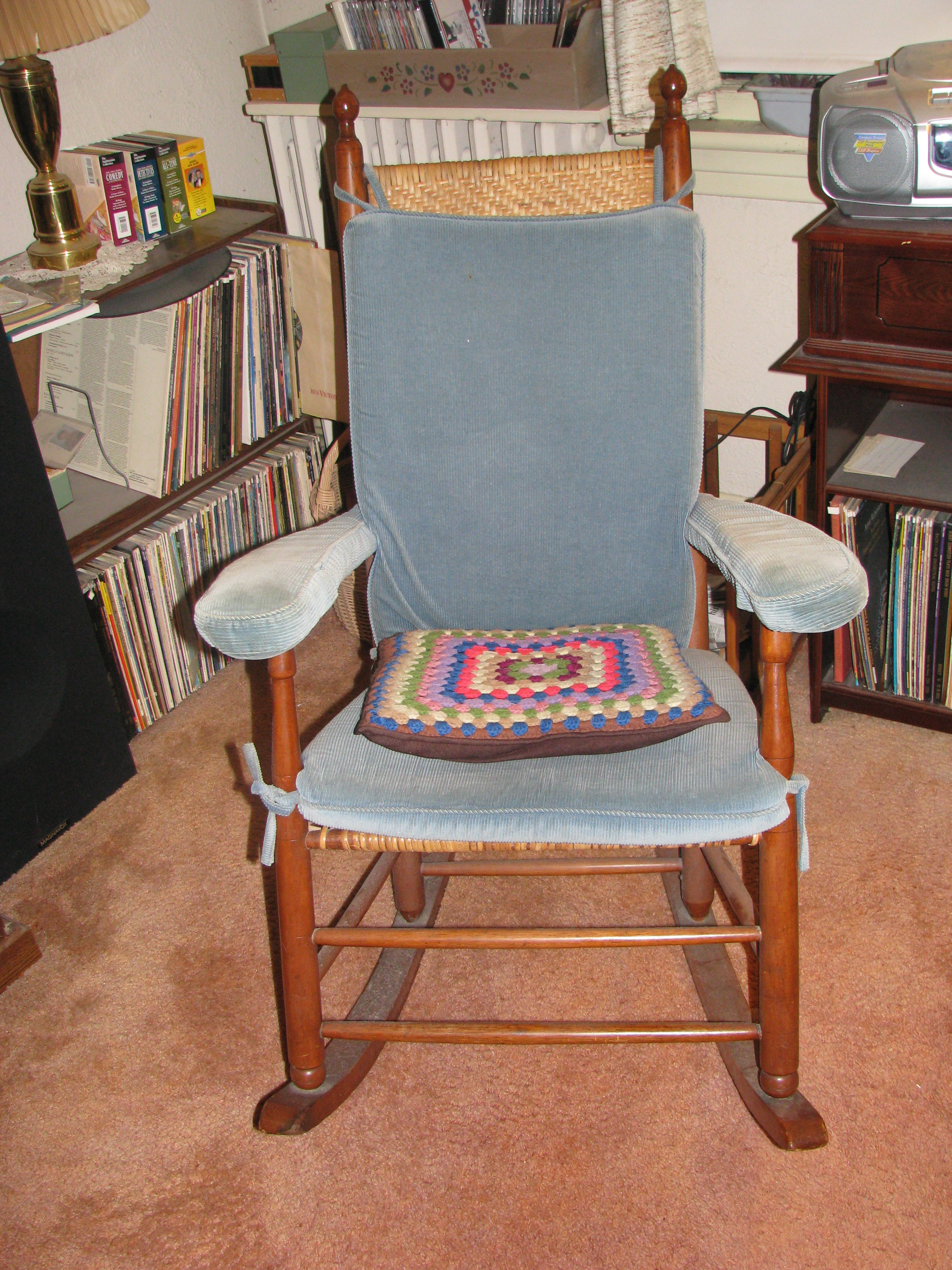
Prof. Gotwald's chair, in which he is seated in 1900 photo above. He died seated in this chair.

Gotwald continued to serve as a professor at Wittenberg, where he continued to be much loved and held in high esteem. He was stricken with paralysis in 1895 and had to resign. The Wittenberg Torch gives this account of it. "About 6:30 last Saturday evening, just after the reverend doctor had arisen from the supper table and gone to his study, his family heard him fall. His groans soon brought them to his side. It was found that he was unconscious and his son, Dr. [David] King Gotwald was hastily sent for [he only lived two houses north of the King Homestead]. He together with Dr. [John Harrison] Rodgers [a great grandson of Robert Quigley] worked with the patient for some time before consciousness was restored. It was discovered that his right side was paralyzed. He suffered greatly Saturday evening, but throughout the Sabbath he rested easily. He was unable to use his voice until Sunday evening, when he spoke a few words. The entire body of students greatly sympathize with Dr. Gotwald and his family in their affliction. The reverend professor is universally loved and respected by all, and it is hoped that he will soon be restored to his accustomed health." The stroke affected his speech and left him partially paralyzed on the right side – unable to perform further either as a professor or in the ministry. In his autobiography, he resigns himself to this fate by merely exclaiming, "God Reigns".

He was then cared for by his son George, by his daughters, Almena and Mary Susan Gotwald, who were living in the King homestead during the time period, and, by his wife Mary Elizabeth for the next five years. The fact that he did recover some of this health is evidenced by photos taken of him standing and smiling, and in the fact that he participated in the founding of the Calvary Lutheran Church in Springfield in 1900—the year of his death. However, he died in Springfield later that year, on September 15, 1900. As his grandson, Luther A. Gotwald Sr. reports it, "on [that] evening, as he sat in his chair by his desk, he had just asked his wife to open the Bible and read their evening lesson together. Suddenly, as a result of another heart attack, he passed away, painlessly and quietly". The president of Wittenberg, Dr. Samuel A. Ort, delivered an eloquent oration at his funeral which was full of affection and praise. Among the many words of praise Ort had for Gotwald was that "he gave himself without grudging to the effort of advancing the prosperity of Wittenberg College. Through term time and vacation period, he toiled for the larger development of our higher educational concerns. He was a man truly valuable to Wittenberg College in all its affairs." He also called him "A noble comrade, a true yoke fellow, we must extol him and say, his value to Wittenberg College was beyond price."

Mary Elizabeth King Gotwald died on November 13, 1919, also in Springfield, Ohio. David H. Bauslin, Dean of Hamma Divinity School of Wittenberg College, was one of the speakers at her funeral. They are buried in Ferncliff Cemetery in Springfield, Ohio, not too far from their home.

== Gotwald children who survived to adulthood ==
All of the Gotwald children who survived to adulthood became respected and prominent citizens.

Their son Dr. David King Gotwald (who went by "King Gotwald") became a prominent physician in Springfield who was known for his modest billing for his services. Dr. King Gotwald kept no financial records on his patients. Instead, once a year he sent them all the same bill of five dollars with a promise of caring for them during that year. He received his early education at the York County Academy and the York Collegiate Institute. He began his medical career by studying pharmacy in a drug stores in York and in Philadelphia, Pennsylvania. He next read medicine with a Dr. Jacob Hay of York. Ultimately, he entered the University of Pennsylvania in 1878 and took a complete four years' course in medicine, from which he graduated with honors in 1882. He shared the Henry C. Lea Prize of two hundred dollars for the best graduating thesis, with Mr. Horace F. Jayne, there being 117 in the class. He was then received the appointment of resident physician in Blockeley Hospital in Philadelphia. In the fall of 1883, he married Julia B. Kurtz of York, Pennsylvania. He moved his practice to Springfield, Ohio, on April 1, 1895. He built his own stately home two houses north of the King Homestead, at 505 North Fountain Avenue, even closer to Wittenberg College than the King Homestead. This home was recently restored and looks very much as it did when Dr. Gotwald had it built. In 1898, as assistant surgeon of the Ohio National Guard, he served with his regiment, the 3rd Ohio Volunteer Infantry, in the Spanish–American War in Cuba. He served as a director of Wittenberg College. His son, William King Gotwald, followed the family calling into the Lutheran ministry and university teaching. He attended Wittenburg College and Hamma Divinity School. He earned his PhD from Johns Hopkins University. He had Lutheran pastorates in churches in Kalamazoo, Michigan, and Wapakoneta, Ohio. He taught history at West Virginia Wesleyan College at Buckhannon, West Virginia. He was a professor at Newberry College, South Carolina. In his last nine years he was a professor of ancient and medieval history at Wittenberg College.

Their son George Daniel Gotwald followed in his father's footsteps by graduating from Gettysburg Seminary and serving as a Lutheran clergyman in Kansas. From the time of his birth his parents consecrated him to the Lutheran ministry. They baptized him in infancy and confirmed him in Easter of 1876 in St. Paul's Church in York, Pennsylvania. He attended York County Academy and graduated with honors from Pennsylvania College and was graduated in 1882.

He attended the Theological Seminary at Gettysburg for three years. Afterward, he was ordained by the West Pennsylvania Synod in St. Paul's Church at York, Pennsylvania, at the same altar at which he had been confirmed. He married Mary B. Baugher in the summer of 1885. His first ministry was the Mission Church at Salina, Kansas, where he was "held in remarkably high esteem by both the congregation and the community." He was chairman of the Music Committee from Pennsylvania College which published The American College Song Book in 1882. In 1888, he became the pastor of the Children's Memorial Lutheran Church in Kansas City, Missouri. He came down with pneumonia, contracted through a cold, which he caught at a funeral on Christmas Day of 1889. He died on January 12, 1890, after a ministry at Kansas City of only a year and two months. George's grandson, Robert Gotwald Remsberg, became a highly respected philosophy professor at Wittenberg University. He was also an ordained Lutheran minister and served as University Pastor. Wittenberg University still honors him with a scholarship it awards in his name. Their son, Robert Caldwell Gotwald, became a well-known architect, who designed many buildings in Springfield and elsewhere. His early education was received at the York County Academy and Pennsylvania College. In 1881 he entered the civil engineering department of Lehigh University at Bethlehem, Pennsylvania, from which he graduated in 1885. The Missouri Pacific Railroad hired him right out of school, where for several years he worked laying extensions to its system in southeastern Nebraska. He then became assistant to the city engineer of Omaha for several years. For "family reasons" he moved to Springfield, Ohio, in 1893, where he not only practiced engineering but also acquired a knowledge of architecture and soon built up a large business in that profession. He designed many of the most prominent buildings in Springfield of that time. He designed the Gotwald Building (sometimes also called the "King Gotwald Building" and later renamed the "M & M Building" after the bank that occupied it), which he designed for his brother, Dr. David King Gotwald, and in which both he and Dr. Gotwald kept their offices. He designed several of the Lutheran churches in Springfield as well as the King Building, Arcue Building and the old Zimmerman Library Building at Wittenberg. He designed the old Springfield City Hospital and was on the Springfield Board of Building Commissioners, at the time of his death, which was constructing the new Springfield City Hospital, which still stands and operates.

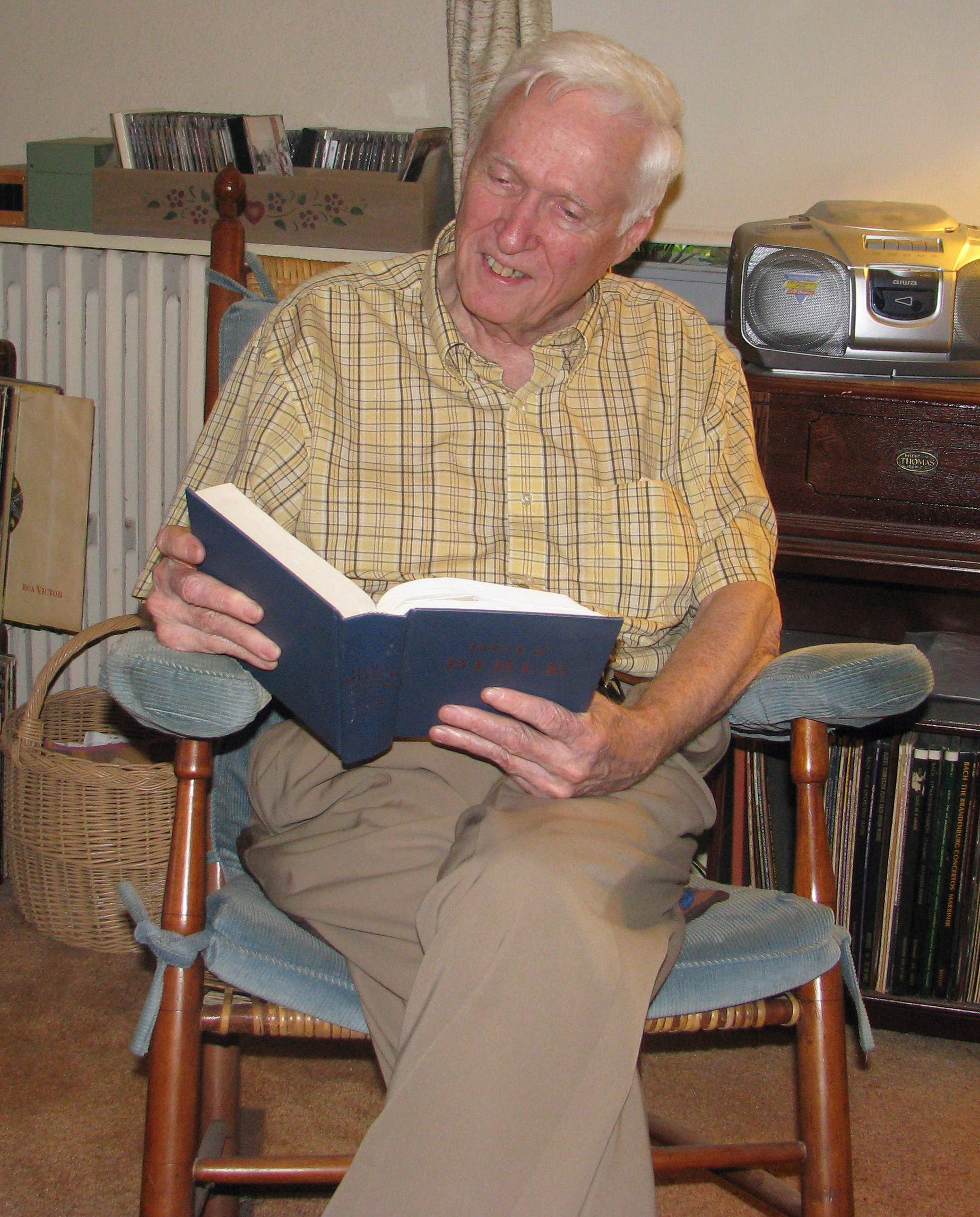
Author Luther Alexander Gotwald Jr.

Their son, Frederick Gebhart Gotwald, went to the public schools from 1875 until 1877 in York, Pennsylvania. He enrolled in the York County Academy until 1884. He attended the York Collegiate Institute for one year. In the fall of 1885 he entered the sophomore class of Pennsylvania College, but only completed one term, because on November 3 of that year, his father moved to Springfield, Ohio, and placed his two sons in Wittenberg College. He married Julia Agnes Small of York, Pennsylvania on June 10, 1897. He built a house next to his father's in 1897. He graduated from Wittenberg in 1888. After college, he studied law in the office of attorney John L. Zimmerman (who presided at his father's heresy trial) from September 1, 1888, until February 1, 1889. He entered Wittenberg Theological Seminary, where his father had become professor two months earlier and began his preparation for the Lutheran ministry. He graduated on May 29, 1891, and was ordained by the Evangelical Lutheran Synod of Miami in October 1891 at Dayton, Ohio. He became an instructor at Hamma Divinity School at Wittenberg College. He served as a member of the board of directors of Wittenberg College from 1894 until 1898. He became the editor of The Lutheran World in 1885, where he served for fifteen years. He founded the Fifth Lutheran Church in Springfield in 1891 and served for many years as its pastor. In 1900, he organized the Calvary Lutheran Church in Springfield, Ohio. He was transferred to York, Pennsylvania in 1904, to become general secretary of the Lutheran Board of Education in which position he served up until the time of his death on February 4, 1926. Before his death, he founded the Advent Lutheran Church in York, Pennsylvania in 1924.

Frederick Gebhart Gotwald was the father of Luther Alexander Gotwald Sr, who graduated from York Academy, Gettysburg College and the Lutheran Theological Seminary. Luther Alexander Gotwald Sr served in the Mission Field of the United Lutheran Church in Madras Presidency, India. He held the position of executive secretary of the Board of Foreign Missions of the United Lutheran Church. He was also the executive secretary of the Division of Foreign Missions of the National Council of the Churches of Christ. His son and the great-grandson of the original Luther Gotwald, Luther Alexander Gotwald Jr is a Lutheran cleric and the author of the Gotwald heresy trial book. He was born to his missionary parents in India. He graduated from Gettysburg College and the Lutheran Theological Seminary. The Central Pennsylvania Synod ordained him as a minister of the United Lutheran church. He had three pastorates in Pennsylvania and acted as an assistant to the Bishop of the Allegheny Synod. He retired in 1992.

The daughter of Luther and Mary Gotwald, Almena Gotwald, was the "apple of her father's eye". He said of her, "She was a beautiful child, with large, dark eyes, and rich brown curls, resembling her father more than any of the children." She attended the Girls Seminary in York, Pennsylvania in 1884 and 1885. When the family moved to Springfield, she attended the "Northern Building" of the Springfield Public Schools until 1889. In 1889 she entered the first year of the Preparatory Department of Wittenberg College. After taking a full seven years course, she graduated in 1896. She then took charge of the King Homestead until her marriage in 1899. During this time she traveled extensively in Colorado, New York City, Boston, and Chicago. In 1897 she was the bridesmaid at her brother Fred's wedding in York, Pennsylvania. On October 12, 1899, she married Glenn M. Cummings, a young attorney from Mansfield, Ohio. The ceremony took in the same place (the west bay window) in the old King Homestead where her parents were married forty years earlier. Her brother Fred performed the ceremony. She first resided in Mansfield, Ohio, but later moved to Cleveland, where her husband Glenn became Chief Counsel of the Cleveland Trust Company.

Their daughter, Mary Susan Gotwald, like her sister, went to school at the Northern building, Springfield. She enrolled in the Preparatory Department at Wittenberg College in 1892, from which she also graduated in 1899 after a full seven years' course. In 1898 she spent the summer in Colorado. She also visited Chicago, Chautauqua and several other destinations. Luther wrote proudly, "In college she was a good student and stood well in her class. Since her graduation, she has taken charge of the house and makes a splendid housekeeper." After Luther's death, she married attorney and jurist Hubert Clay Pontius, of Canton, Ohio, who served as prosecuting attorney and judge in Stark County, Ohio.

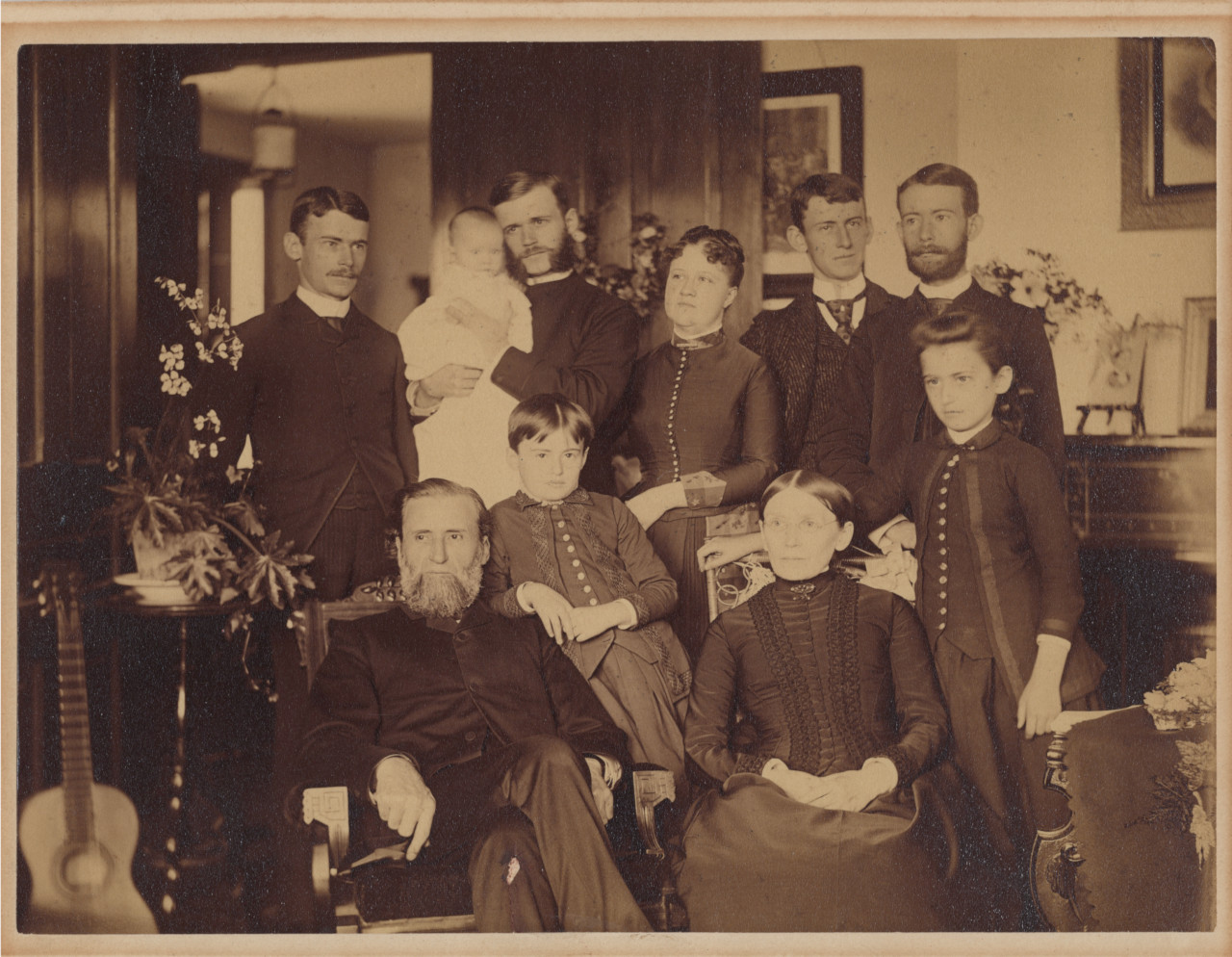
Luther Alexander Gotwald Family in late 1888
