= The Vagabonds (1937 film) =

- Directed by: Karel Lamac
- Written by: Karl Lindau (libretto); Leopold Krenn (libretto); Géza von Cziffra
- Produced by: Gustav Althoff
- Starring: Paul Hörbiger; Lucie Englisch; Gretl Theimer
- Cinematography: Edgar S. Ziesemer
- Edited by: Johanna Rosinski
- Music by: Carl Michael Ziehrer (operetta); Paul Hühn
- Production company: Aco-Film
- Distributed by: Mitteldeutsche Union-Tonfilm; Lux-Film (Austria)
- Release date: 3 September 1937
- Running time: 95 minutes
- Country: Germany
- Language: German

The Vagabonds (German: Die Landstreicher) is a 1937 German operetta film directed by Karel Lamac and starring Paul Hörbiger, Lucie Englisch and Gretl Theimer. It is an adaptation of the 1899 operetta of the same name by Carl Michael Ziehrer.

Location shooting took place around Lake Schliersee.

== Cast ==
- Paul Hörbiger as Haselhof
- Lucie Englisch as Steffi
- Erika Druzovic as Julliane Marie
- Rudolf Carl as Kasimir
- Rudolf Platte as Brack
- Gretl Theimer as Christl
- Wastl Witt as Stolzingen
- Walter Grüters as Nieder
- Leo Peukert as Bürgermeister
- Werner Finck as Der Graf

== See also ==
- The Vagabonds (1916)

== Bibliography ==
- Bock, Hans-Michael & Bergfelder, Tim. The Concise CineGraph. Encyclopedia of German Cinema. Berghahn Books, 2009.
