= List of operettas by Carl Michael Ziehrer =

This is a complete list of operettas by Karl Michael Ziehrer (1843–1922).

== List ==
Title	Genre	Subdivisions	Libretto	Première date	Place, theatre
Mahomed's Paradies	Burleske-Operette	1 act	Composer	26 February 1866	Vienna, Harmonietheater
Das Orakel zu Delfi	Burleske-Operette	2 acts	Carl Costa	21 September 1872	Linz, Landestheater
Cleopatra, oder Durch drei Jahrtausende (together with: Richard Genée and Max von Weinzierl)	fantastic burlesque	3 sections	J. Steinher	13 November 1875	Vienna, Komische Oper
König Jérôme oder Immer lustick!	Operette	4 acts	Adolf Schirmer	28 November 1878	Vienna, Ringtheater
Der kleine Don Juan	Operette		Ludwig Ernst Pohlhammer	November 1879	Budapest, Deutsches Theater
Wiener Kinder	Operette	3 acts	Leopold Krenn and Carl Wolff	19 January 1881	Vienna, Carltheater
Ein Deutschmeister	Operette	3 acts	Richard Genée and Bruno Zappert	30 November 1888	Vienna, Carltheater
Wiener Luft	Posse mit Gesang	3 acts	Benno Rauchenegger	10 May 1889	Vienna, Theater an der Wien
Der bleiche Zauberer	Indianisches Lagerbild	1 act	Isidor Fuchs, based on an Indian story by James Fenimore Cooper	20 September 1890	Vienna, Theater an der Wien
Der schöne Rigo	Operette	2 acts	Leopold Krenn and Karl Lindau	24 May 1898	Vienna, 'Sommertheater Venedig in Wien'
Die Landstreicher	Operette	Prologue and 2 acts	Leopold Krenn and Karl Lindau	26 July 1899	Vienna, 'Sommertheater Venedig in Wien'
Die drei Wünsche	Operette	Prologue and 3 acts	Leopold Krenn and Karl Lindau	9 March 1901	Vienna, Carltheater
Der Fremdenführer	Operette	Prologue and 3 acts	Leopold Krenn and Karl Lindau	11 October 1902	Vienna, Theater an der Wien
Der Schätzmeister	Operette	3 acts	Alexander Engel and Julius Horst	10 December 1904	Vienna, Carltheater
Fesche Geister	Operette	Prologue and 2 sections	Leopold Krenn and Karl Lindau	7 July 1905	Vienna, 'Sommertheater Venedig in Wien'
Über'n großen Teich (together with: Edmund Eysler, Bela von Ujj and F. Ziegler)	Operette		Adolph Philipp	2 September 1906	Vienna, Theater an der Wien
Die Spottvogelwirtin		3 acts	Rudolf Österreicher	1906	Vienna
Ein tolles Mädel (English: Mlle Mischief)	Vaudeville-Operette	Prologue and 2 acts	Wilhelm Sterk (after: Kurt Kraatz and Heinrich Stobitzer) (English: Sydney Rosenfeld)	24 August 1907, English version: 28 September 1908	Wiesbaden; English version: New York City, Lyric Theatre;
Am Lido	Operette	1 act	Ottokar Tann-Bergler and Alfred Deutsch-German	31 August 1907	Vienna, Kolosseum
Der Liebeswalzer	Operette	3 acts	Robert Bodanzky and Fritz Grünbaum	24 October 1908	Vienna, Raimund Theater
Herr und Frau Biedermeier	Singspiel	1 act	Wilhelm Sterk	9 January 1909	Munich, 'Kleine Bühne'
Die Gaukler	Operette	1 act	Emil Golz and Arnold Golz	6 September 1909	Vienna, Apollotheater
Ball bei Hof	Operette	3 acts	Wilhelm Sterk (after the comedy "Hofgunst" by Thilo von Trotha)	22 January 1911	Stettin, Stadttheater
In fünfzig Jahren — "Zukunftstraum einer Küchenfee"	Burleske-Operette	2 acts	Leopold Krenn and Karl Lindau	13 January 1911	Vienna, Ronacher
Manöverkinder	Operette	2 acts	Oskar Friedmann and Fritz Lunzer	22 June 1912	Vienna, Sommerbühne 'Kaisergarten'
Der Husarengeneral (new version of Manöverkinder)	Operette	3 acts	Oskar Friedmann and Fritz Lunzer	3 October 1913	Vienna, Raimund Theater
Fürst Casimir	Operette	3 acts	Max Neal and Max Ferner	13 September 1913	Vienna, Carltheater
Das dumme Herz	Operette	3 acts	Rudolf Österreicher and Wilhelm Sterk	27 February 1914	Vienna, Johann Strauss Theater
Der Kriegsberichterstatter (together with: Edmund Eysler, Bruno Granichstaedten, Oskar Nedbal and Charles Weinberger)	Operette	8 scenes	Rudolf Österreicher and Wilhelm Sterk	(1914)	
Im siebenten Himmel	Operette	3 acts	Max Neal and Max Ferner	26 February 1916	Munich, Theater am Gärtnerplatz
Deutschmeisterkapelle	Operette		Hubert Marischka and Rudolf Österreicher	30 May 1958	Vienna, Raimund Theater
Die verliebte Eskadron	Operette	3 acts	Wilhelm Sterk (after Bernhard Buchbinder)	11 July 1930	Vienna, Johann Strauss Theater
