= Ziener =

Ziener is a surname. Notable people with the surname include:

- Bruno Ziener (1870–1941), German actor and film director
- Gunhild Ziener (1868–1937), Norwegian politician
- Manny Ziener (1887–1972), German actress

== See also ==
- Ziegner
- Zierer (surname)
