= Zier =

Zier is a given name and a surname. Notable people with the name include:

- Édouard François Zier (1856–1924), French illustrator and painter
- Zier Tebbenhoff (born 1972), Dutch footballer

== See also ==
- Zierer (surname)
- Ziehr
