= Peter Zauner (composer) =

Early 20th-century Austrian musician and composer

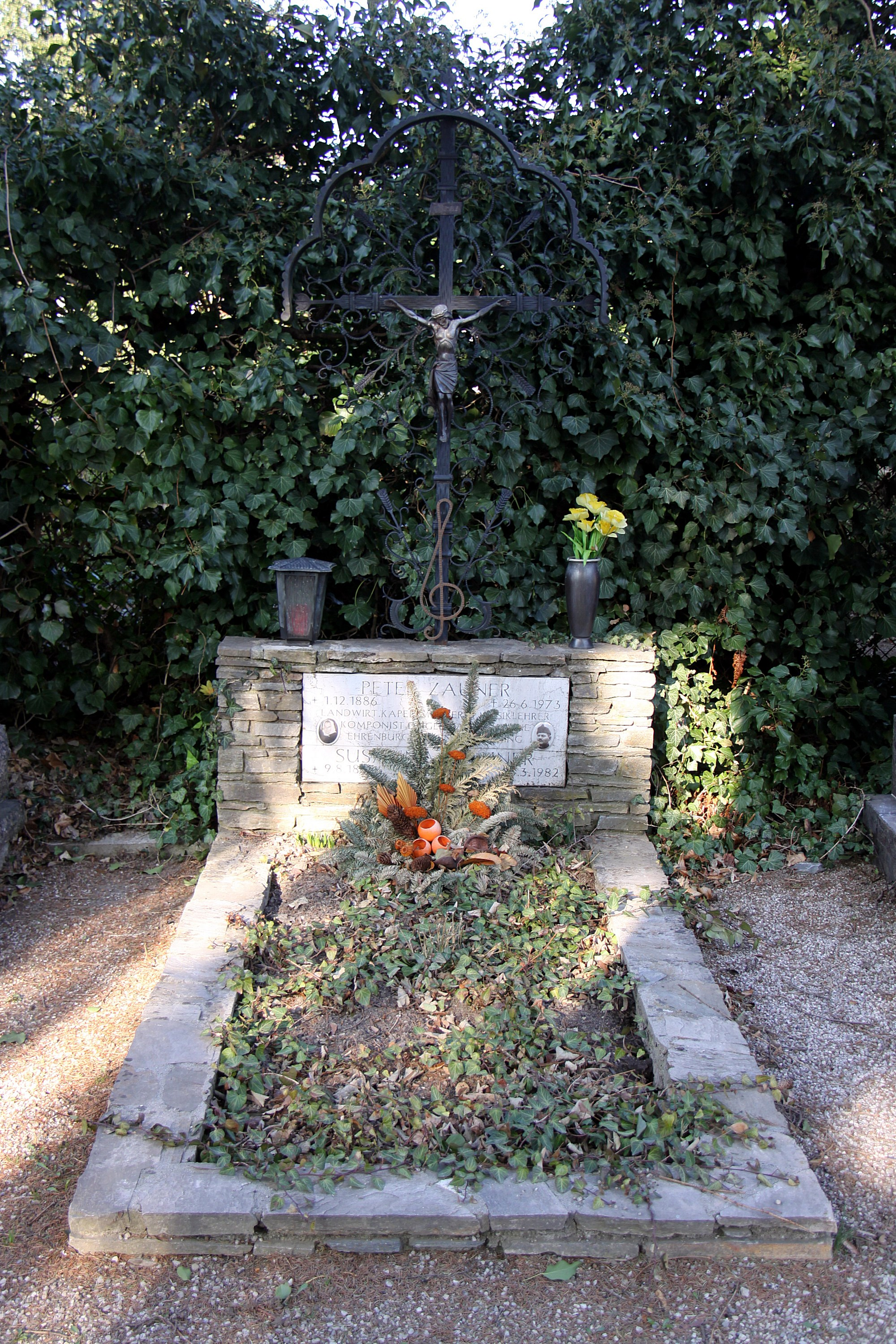
Grave of honor for Peter Zauner, Pöttsching cemetery

Peter Zauner (1 December 1886 – 26 June 1973) was an Austrian farmer, Kapellmeister, composer, church musician and music teacher. In his Austrian homeland he is primarily remembered as the composer of the anthem of the Burgenland state, "Mein Heimatvolk, mein Heimatland".

== Life ==
Zauner was born in Pöttsching, Burgenland, as the son of a winegrower, master shoemaker and musician who was a member of the Carl Michael Ziehrer musical ensemble, where he rose to play the lead violin. His son Peter received his first violin lessons at the age of five. During his military service in Vienna, beginning in 1903, he received further music lessons and joined the military music corps of the Infantry Regiment 71 in Trenčín and worked from 1908 as a conductor in Pöttsching and Wiener Neustadt. During the First World War he served as a combat medic at the rank of a sergeant.

Upon his return to his home town Pöttsching he took over his family farm and from 1919 to 1948 he served as music teacher in the rural areas of the Mattersburg and Eisenstadt districts. He established his Z-Banda and quickly became a role model for many concert bands of the Burgenland.

He and his band had already been renown throughout the various regions of Austria, when he composed his Burgenland national anthem. At the 1936 Vaterländische Front competition for the composition of the anthem, the jury panel pointed out that the work should preferably be of "artistic value, easy to sing and folkloristic". In its closing session on 30 April 1936 the jury selected Zauner's musical composition of Ernst Görlich's poem "Mein Heimatvolk, mein Heimatland" (My people, my homeland) from a total of 283 applications.

Zauner continued to be a winemaker and in 1938 he founded the Erste burgenländische Winzergenossenschaft Pöttsching (First Burgenland Vintner Cooperative Pöttsching). He also made a name for himself as he promoted the cultivation and growth of tobacco in his home region.

He died in Pöttsching and is buried there in an Ehrengrab.

== Works ==
Between 1901 and 1968 Zauner produced a total of 234 musical compositions, mainly works for strings and wind orchestras (marches, waltzes, polkas, Ländler), piano works, vocal works (songs for folklore theatre pieces). The Burgenland state anthem was his 58th work. The "Wieser Graben-Polka", also known as "Erinnerungen an Brennberg" (Memories of Brennberg) remains one of Zauner's most popular works throughout Alpine German-speaking countries.
