= Karl Lindau =

Austrian actor, librettist and writer

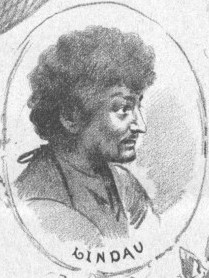
- Lindau in 1886
- Born: Karl Gemperle; 26 November 1853; Vienna, Austrian Empire
- Died: 15 January 1934 (aged 80); Vienna, Austria
- Other names: Carl Lindau
- Occupations: Actor; Writer; Librettist
- Organization: Theater an der Wien

Karl Lindau (also Carl Lindau, born Karl Gemperle; 26 November 1853 – 15 January 1934) was an Austrian actor and writer. He excelled in comic roles at the Theater an der Wien, and wrote several plays, librettos for operettas and songs.

== Career ==
Karl Gemperle was born in Vienna, the son of Anton Gemperle, a coffee substitute manufacturer. His grandfather, the Swiss Johann Baptist Gemperle, had founded the first Viennese surrogate coffee factory. After a technical school education Lindau turned to theatre and made his debut on 20 October 1870 in Graz in the title role of Schiller's Don Carlos. Engagements followed at the Deutsches Theater in Pest, in Frankfurt am Main and in Dresden, in 1879 again in Graz and in 1880 briefly in Olomouc. During this time, Lindau slowly turned from classical roles to comic roles. In 1880, he toured successfully through the United States and Canada with Josefine Gallmeyer, Wilhelm Knaack and Franz Tewele. In 1881, he was finally engaged by director Franz Steiner as a comedian at the Theater an der Wien and was a member of the ensemble until 1901. His roles in operettes and Wiener Possen made him a darling of the audience. He played Süffle in the premiere of Zeller's Der Vogelhändler on 10 January 1891.

From 1876, Lindau was also active as a writer for the stage. In total he wrote more than 100 full-length plays, including lustspiels, farces and libretti for operettas, some of which became very popular. Together with Leopold Krenn (1850–1930), he wrote farces (Possen) such as Heißes Blut (Hot Blood, 1892), Ein armes Mädel (A Poor Girl, 1893) and Der Nazi (1895). (Note: The title, translated as The Nazi, refers to the diminutive form of the first name of Ignatz Wirbel, a character in the play.) In their operettas, Krenn and Lindau provided parade roles for Alexander Girardi, such as Korporal Kratz in Der Fremdenführer, with music by Carl Michael Ziehrer. Lindau also translated French comedies into German.

Lindau died in Vienna.

== Works ==
Lindau wrote several librettos for operettas:

- 1899: Die Landstreicher, Operette in zwei Akten und einem Vorspiele. Libretto with Leopold Krenn. Music by Carl Michael Ziehrer. (premiere 26 July 1899)
- 1900: Der Schelm von Bergen. Komisch-romantische Operette in 3 Akten. Libretto with Konrad Loewe. Music by Alfred Oelschlegel.
- 1902: Der Fremdenführer. Operette in einem Vorspiel und drei Akten. Libretto with Leopold Krenn. Music by Carl Michael Ziehrer.
- 1903: Frühlingsluft. Operette in drei Akten. Libretto with Julius Wilhelm. Music by Ernst Reiterer "after Josef Strauss motives". (premiere: 9 May 1903)
- 1904: Die Eisjungfrau. Operette in 2 Akten. Libretto with Julius Wilhelm. Music by Josef Hellmesberger (after Gustave Adolph Kerker).
- 1904: Wien bei Nacht. Burleske in 1 Akt. Libretto with Julius Wilhelm. Music by Josef Hellmesberger.
- 1904: Jung Heidelberg. Operette in 3 Akten. Libretto with Leopold Krenn. Music by Ernst Reiterer nach Motiven von Karl Millöcker. (UA: 9 July 1904)
- 1905: Frauenherz. Operette in 3 Akten. Libretto (after the French). Music by Josef Strauss, arranged by Ernst Reiterer.
- 1905: Die Schützenliesel. Operette in 3 Acten. Libretto with Leo Stein. Music by Edmund Eysler.
- 1905: Der Schnurrbart. Operette in 3 Akten. Libretto with Leo Stein. Music by Verő György.
- 1906: 1001 Nacht. Fantastische Operette in einem Vorspiel und zwei Akten. Libretto with Leo Stein. Music by Johann Strauss II, edited by Ernst Reiterer. (UA: 27 October 1907)
- 1906: Künstlerblut. Operette in 1 Vorspiel und 2 Akten. Libretto with Leo Stein. Music by Edmund Eysler.
- 1907: Monte Carlo. Operette in 3 Akten. Libretto with F. Antony (nach einem Stoff von Heribert Hülgerth). Music by Ludwig Roman Chmel.
- 1910: Lord Piccolo (with Carl Lindau), operetta in 2 acts composed by Henri Berény; premiered Vienna, Johann Strauss Theater, 9 January 1910
- 1911: Die romantische Frau. Operette in 3 Akten. Libretto with Bela Jenbach (after a comedy by Ernst Wichert). Music by Charles Weinberger.
- 1911: Vielliebchen. Operette in drei Akten. Libretto with Rudolf Österreicher and M. A. Weikone. Music by Ludwig Engländer.
- 1911: Das geborgte Schloß. Operette in 3 Akten. Libretto with Verő György. Music by Hermann Dostal.
- 1911: Der Frauenfresser. Operette in 3 Akten. Libretto with Leo Stein and Eugen Spero. Music by Edmund Eysler.
- 1915: Der Weltenbummler. Operette in einem Vorspiel und 2 Akten. Libretto with Fritz Löhner-Beda. Music by Richard Fall.
- Graf Sandor. Operette in 3 Akten. Libretto with Leopold Krenn. Music by Hermann Dostal.

== Filmography ==
- The Vagabonds, directed by Luise Fleck and Jacob Fleck (Austria, 1916)
- Schützenliesel, directed by Rudolf Walther-Fein and Rudolf Dworsky (Germany, 1926)
- The Vagabonds, directed by Karel Lamač (Germany, 1937)
- Frühlingsluft, directed by Karel Lamač (Germany, 1938)
- Schützenliesel, directed by Rudolf Schündler (West Germany, 1954)
- Die Landstreicher, directed by Peter Dörre (West Germany, 1968, TV film)
