= Ziegner =

Ziegner is a German surname. Notable people with the surname include:

- Hermann Ziegner (1864–1898), United States Army soldier and Medal of Honor recipient
- Torsten Ziegner (born 1977), German footballer and manager

== See also ==
- Ziegler
- Ziener
