= Hermann Dostal =

Hermann Dostal (1874 in Mährisch-Ostrau (today Moravská Ostrava) – 20 December 1930 in Vienna) was an Austrian composer and arranger.

As the son of a military musician, he was himself the military Kapellmeister of Austrian-Hungarian infantry regiments in Hungary, Slovakia and South Moravia. He served in various military bands of the Danube Monarchy, among others with Franz Lehár, whose successor he became in 1904 with the infantry regiment no. 26. Hermann Dostal was the uncle of the composer Nico Dostal. His grave is in the Vienna Central Cemetery.

== Works ==
- Eine göttliche Nacht (1910), musical burlesque, 1 act, Julius Wilhelm
- Das geborgte Schloß (1911), operette, 3 acts, Karl Lindau/Georg Verö
- Der fliegende Rittmeister. (1912), operette, 1 act (including the famous Fliegermarsch), Bela Jenbach/Leo Stein
- Urschula (1916), musical farce, 3 acts, Bela Jenbach/Julius Wilhelm
- Nimm mich mit! (1919), operette, 3 acts, Heinrich von Waldberg/Alfred Maria Willner (über 150 Aufführungen)
- Graf Sandor, 3 acts, Leopold Krenn/Karl Lindau
