= König Jérôme =

König Jérôme oder Immer Lustick is a comic operetta in five acts by Karl Michael Ziehrer with the text by Adolf Schirmer (1810–1886). Its first performance was at the Ringtheater in Vienna on 28 November 1878 with Ziehrer himself directing the theatre orchestra. The operetta was only of mediocre popularity and its fate was sealed when the Ringtheatre inferno happened in 1881 which destroyed large parts of the orchestral score. Of the entire score, the only pieces which survived were the Overture, the piano excerpts as well as the aria "Verliebt" (In Love).

König Lustig (or "Lustik"/"Lustick"/"Lustigk") was the popular nickname for Jérôme Bonaparte (1784–1860) when he was King of Westphalia from 1807 to 1813.
