= Zierlein =

Zierlein is a surname. It is a diminutive from the nickname Zier. Notable people with the surname include:

- Lance Zierlein, American sports analyst and commentator
- Larry Zierlein (born 1945), American football coach

== See also ==
- Zierer (surname)
