= Mein Heimatvolk, mein Heimatland =

Anthem of an Austrian State

English: My Countrymen, my Homeland
- Coat of Arms of Burgenland
- Regional anthem of Burgenland
- Lyrics: Ernst Joseph Görlich
- Music: Peter Zauner
- Adopted: 30 April 1936
- Readopted: 1949
- Relinquished: 1 October 1938

"Mein Heimatvolk, mein Heimatland” is the regional anthem of the Austrian state of Burgenland. It was adopted during the Austrofascist era, but relinquished 2 years later, and then readopted in 1949 during the Soviet Occupation.

== Origin and history ==
A tender for the text of a state anthem for the Burgenland, the youngest of the Austrian states, was advertised by the Fatherland Front of the Federal State of Austria in October 1935 in the party newspaper Burgenländisches Volksblatt. According to the announcement, the anthem should express "joy and pride in the Burgenland homeland and belonging to the Burgenland people" and "the bond with the great Austrian fatherland".

The tender was decided in two phases, for text and music, by two jurys of 13 men. From 105 submissions, the text "Mein Heimatvolk, mein Heimatland” by the unknown Ernst Joseph Görlich (1905–1973), a teacher at the Catholic teacher training college in Steinberg-Dörfl, Burgenland.

Tenders for the melody were advertised on 8 February 1936, asking that it should be "artistically valuable, easy to sing, and folksy", and on April 30, 1936, the submission by the well-regarded violinist and composer Peter Zauner was selected from 283 applications. The winning project was adopted by the Burgenland state parliament on 22 May 1936 as the state anthem.

However, the anthem was only used for two years, since after the Anschluss of Austria into Nazi Germany with effect from October 1, 1938, Burgenland was divided into Reichsgau Niederdonau (Lower Danube) and Reichsgau Steiermark (Styria). In 1949, after World War II, the national anthem was reinstated by law with the approval of the Soviet military administration.

== Text ==
German original
Mein Heimatvolk, mein Heimatland, mit Österreich verbunden!
Auf Dir ruht Gottes Vaterhand, Du hast sie oft empfunden.
Du bist gestählt in hartem Streit zu Treue, Fleiß und Redlichkeit.
𝄆 Am Bett der Raab, am Heiderand, Du bist mein teures Burgenland! 𝄇

Rot-Gold flammt Dir das Fahnentuch, Rot-Gold sind Deine Farben!
Rot war der heißen Herzen Spruch, die für die Heimat starben!
Gold ist der Zukunft Sonnenlicht, das strahlend auf Dich niederbricht!
𝄆 Stolz trägt das Volk Dein Wappenband: Du bist mein teures Burgenland! 𝄇

Mein Heimatvolk, mein Heimatland! Mit Öst’reichs Länderbunde
hält dich verknüpft das Bruderband schon manche gute Stunde!
An Kraft und Treue allen gleich, Du jüngstes Kind von Österreich.
𝄆 Zu Dir steh’ ich mit Herz und Hand: Du bleibst mein teures Burgenland! 𝄇

Literal translation
My countrymen, my homeland, connected to Austria!
God's father's hand rests on you, you have often felt it.
You are steeled in hard strife for loyalty, diligence and honesty.
𝄆 On the bed of the Raab, on the edge of the heath, you are my dear Burgenland! 𝄇

The flag is blazing red and gold, your colors are red and gold!
Red was the motto of hot hearts that died for their homeland!
Gold is the sunlight of the future that shines down on you!
𝄆 The people proudly wear your coat of arms: You are my dear Burgenland! 𝄇

My native people, my native land! With Austria's federal states
the brother bond has kept you bound for many a good hour!
Equal to all in strength and loyalty, you youngest child of Austria.
𝄆 I stand by you with heart and hand: You remain my dear Burgenland! 𝄇

== Melody ==
Source
