= Schönemann =

Schönemann, also spelled Schoenemann, is a German surname. "Schaneman", is the modern spelling.

See:

- Dora Schönemann (born 1911), German swimmer
- Hinnerk Schönemann (born 1974), German actor
- Lili Schönemann (1758–1817), daughter of a banker from Frankfurt
- Peter Schönemann, German psychometrician and statistician
- Theodor Schönemann (1812–1868), German mathematician
