= Beale M. Schmucker =

Beale Melanchthon Schmucker (August 26, 1827 – October 15, 1888) was an American Lutheran leader, liturgical scholar and historian.

== Biography ==
The Rev. Beale M. Schmucker, D.D. was born in Gettysburg, Pennsylvania, the son of German-American Lutheran pastor and theologian Samuel Simon Schmucker and Mary Catherine Steenbergen. He was graduated from Pennsylvania College during 1844. In 1847, Schmucker was a graduate of the Lutheran Theological Seminary at Gettysburg. Schmucker served as Secretary of the Alumni Association of Philadelphia Lutheran Seminary at the time of his death in 1888. In 1870 he received the degree of D.D. from the University of Pennsylvania.

Schmucker was the pastor of Lutheran churches in Martinsburg, Virginia and Shepherdstown, Virginia, 1847–51; Allentown, Pennsylvania, 1852; Easton, Pennsylvania, 1862; Reading, Pennsylvania, 1867; and Pottstown, Pennsylvania, 1881–88.

Schmucker collaborated with A. T. Geissenhainer on A Liturgy for the Use of the Evangelical Lutheran Church. In particular, Schmucker worked to revive historic liturgical practice. His knowledge of details in matters pertaining to the order of service, especially of the Lutheran Church of the sixteenth and seventeenth centuries, was unusually extensive and accurate.

== Selected works ==
- The First Pennsylvania Liturgy, Adopted in 1748 (1882)
- The Early History of the Tulpehocken Churches (1882)
- The Lutheran Church in Pottstown (1882)
- The Lutheran Church in Frederick, Maryland (in Quarterly Review, 1883)
- The Lutheran Church in the City of New York during the First Century of its History (in Church Review, 1884–85)
- The Organization of the Congregation in the Early Lutheran Churches in America (1887)
- A Liturgy for the Use of the Evangelical Lutheran Church(1888)

He was co-editor of the Hallesche Nachrichten (Allentown, Pennsylvania, and Halle, Germany, vol. i., 1884; English ed., Reading, Pennsylvania, vol. i., 1882), which is the primary source of information concerning the early history of the Lutheran Church in the United States. Schmucker also edited:

- Liturgy of the Ministerium of Pennsylvania (Philadelphia, 1860)
- Collection of Hymns of the Ministerium of Pennsylvania (1865)
- Church-Book of the General Council (1868)
- Ministerial Acts of the General Council (1887).

He published numerous articles on doctrinal, historical, and liturgical subjects, of which many have been republished separately in pamphlet-form.

== Other sources ==
- Gross, Ernie. This Day In Religion. New York: Neal-Schuman Publishing, 1999. ISBN 1-55570-045-4.
