= List of dances and marches by Karl Michael Ziehrer =

This is a list of the dances and marches by Karl Michael Ziehrer (1843–1922). They are arranged in opus number order.

Opus number	Title	Translation	Genre	Notes
64	König von Sachsen Huldigungs-Marsch	King of Saxony Ovation March	march	Was written in honour of King Johann of Saxony, who fled to Vienna after his troops lost a battle in neighbouring Bohemia. The work is one of Ziehrer's earlier compositions, and was first performed at the Neue Welt establishment in Vienna on 26 July 1866, two years after the composer's debut.
66	Auf hoher See	On the High Seas	waltz	Written two years after the composer's debut, and dedicated to an Austrian naval commander who had just won a victory over the Italian navy, Ziehrer first performed this waltz at a summer concert at the Neue Welt establishment in Vienna on 10 October 1866.
78	Im Fluge	In Flight		
120	Augensprach	Catch Your Eye	polka-mazurka	First performed on 19 July 1868 at the Wendls Etablissement near Vienna. Although predominantly a major-chord composer, Ziehrer makes use of minor keys in this composition.
159	In Reih' und Glied	Line Up	polka française	First performed on 9 June 1870 at the Kaffeehaus im Prater, where Ziehrer's military band, performing as a civilian orchestra (as was the custom) frequently performed.
161	Cis und Trans	Cis and Trans	polka-mazurka	
318	In der Sommerfrische	At the Summer Resort	waltz	
374	Das liegt bei uns im Blut!	It Lies in Our Spirit!	polka-mazurka	
382	Faschingskinder		waltz	
386	Loslassen!	Release!	polka	
388	Weaner Mad’ln	Viennese Girls or Viennese Beauties	waltz	Composed by Ziehrer during his tenure as bandmaster of the Hoch und-Deutschmeister Regiment, and first performed in January 1888. It is one of Ziehrer's most famous compositions. The introduction of the waltz features a whistling theme, a novelty of Ziehrer.
406	Ballfieber	Ball Fever	Polka-francaise	Was first performed at the Sofiensaal in Vienna in January 1889.
415	Natursänger	Nature Singers	waltz	Features birdsong, a novelty of Ziehrer. The composition was first performed at a regimental concert on 17 January 1890, at the Harmonie-Saal in Vienna, and was very well received. At the time, the Archduke Wilhelm purchased the piano score to have it played at a royal family dinner that he was hosting, a sign of the respect the nobility had for Ziehrer.
419	Wiener Bürger	Viennese Citizens	waltz	One of Ziehrer's most famous compositions.
422	Freiherr von Schönfeld Marsch		march	
438	Heimatsgefühle		waltz	
444	Gebirgskinder	Mountain Children	waltz	First performed in November 1892 at the Laxemburg Castle. The composition has remained one of Ziehrer's more famous works, and features a zither solo in its introduction. The waltz was originally written for accompaniment by a humming male voice choir.
445	Frauenlogik	Women's Logic	polka	First performed at the Sofiensaal in Vienna on 17 January 1893.
454	Cavallerie Polka française	Cavalry French Polka	polka	First performed at the famous Musikvereinssaal in Vienna on 9 February 1893, when Ziehrer, as the bandmaster of the Hoch-und-Deutschmeister regiment, conducted a celebration concert for the Cavalry. The composition was dedicated to the officer corps of the Austro-Hungarian Cavalry, under its original title, Reiterei. The trio of the polka was written in a style similar to that of the Fehrbelliner Reitermarsch, written by Richard Henrion.
466	Die Nachtschwaermer	The Night Owl Waltz	waltz	One of his most spirited compositions. The slow waltz melody, in the introduction, is sung by the orchestra, in a German dialect.
478	Ziehrereien	Ziehrer-ish Waltzes	waltz	First performed by Ziehrer at one of his regular concerts at the Ronacher in November 1897. The melodies of the waltz are taken from several of his previous compositions, including Echt Wienerisch, op. 381, Jérôme-Quadrille, op. 320, Militär Marsch, op. 321 and Verliebt, Op. 319.
498	Seculo nuovo, vita nuova	New Century, New Life	waltz	One of four compositions that Ziehrer wrote for Vienna's 1900 Carnival to celebrate the new century, premiering in early January 1900. The work's Italian title reflects its original scoring for mandolin and guitar, as it was first published in Trieste.
501	Auf In's XX. Jahrhundert!	Into the Twentieth Century!	march	One of Ziehrer's contributions to the 1900 Vienna Carnival to mark the turn of the century. It was written for the Concordia Ball in February 1900.
505	Buberl, komm'!	Come Along, Laddy!	waltz	Arranged from Ziehrer's operetta Die drei Wünsche (' The Three Wishes '), written in 1901.
518	Herrreinspaziert!	Here Come the Gentlemen!	waltz	Taken from the operetta Der Schätzmeister.
522	Sei Brav!	So Good!	waltz	Taken from the operetta Fesche Geister.
525	Facher-Polonaise		polonaise	
526	Tolles Mädel!	Crazy Girl!	waltz	Taken from Ziehrer's operetta Ein tolles Mädel!.
535	Neger-Polka		polka	
536	Barrison-Marsch		march	
537	Liebeswalzer	Lovers' Waltz	waltz	Takes its melodies from Ziehrer's operetta Liebeswalzer.
538	Liebesgeheimnis Polka		polka	
539	Wenn man Geld hat, ist man fein!	If One has Money, One is Great!	march	Takes its melodies from Ziehrer's 1908 operetta Liebeswalzer. The melody contains counterpoint that is not always evident in similar works by his contemporaries.
541	Faschingsträume Walzer		waltz	
546	Biedermeier-Walzer		waltz	
547	Ball bei Hof Walzer	Ball at the Court	waltz	
548	Duck' dich Manderl!	Take Cover!	march	This work takes its melodies from Ziehrer's 1911 operetta, Ball bei Hof (' Ball at the Court '). It was dedicated to the wife of Count Ferdinand. The composition first premiered in Stettin. The march does not follow the standard form, having no repeats.
549	Wiener Leb'n und Wiener Leut'!		waltz	
550	Elizabeth Marie-Gavotte	Elizabeth Marie Gavotte	gavotte	
551	Casimir-Walzer	Casimir Waltz	waltz	
552	O diese Husaren!	Oh, these Hussars!	waltz	Includes melodies from Ziehrer's operetta Der Husarengeneral.
553	Husarenstreiche		march	
554	Ich lach!	I Laugh!	waltz	Composed in 1914. Its melodies were taken from Ziehrer's operetta Das dumme Herz (' The Stupid Heart '). The waltz opens with rhythmic refrains taken from the trio in Ziehrer's polka Schneidig!, op. 387. The waltz is given its title from the original refrain of Girardi’s song Für Herz und Seel’ ist Ruh’ nur g’sund, ich lach (' For heart and soul rest is wholesome - I laugh ').
558	Kaiser Karl-Marsch	Emperor Karl March	march	Created after the death of Austrian emperor Francis Joseph.
559	Krönungsmarsch	Coronation March	march	Created for the coronation of Karl, the new (and last) reigning Habsburg monarch, in December of 1916.
563	Kurbilder		waltz	Written for the Concordia Ball. Ziehrer was too ill to attend the first performance of the work, despite it being announced that he would be the guest conductor.
564	Studentenräume		waltz	Ziehrer's last waltz.
