= Ziervogel =

Ziervogel is a German language surname. Notable people with the name include:

- Benjamin Ziervogel (1983), Austrian violinist
- Jeremias Ziervogel (1802–1883), founding member of the Cape Parliament
- Meike Ziervogel (1967), German novelist and publisher
- Ralf Ziervogel (1975), German artist
