= Wilhelm Ziehr =

German writer (born 1938)

Wilhelm Ziehr (born 21 November 1938 in Berlin) is a German writer, historian, and lexicographer.

== Life ==
He spent a part of his childhood in Thuringia and went to a high school in Eisenberg (Abitur, 1957)

He studied German and Romance philology at the University of Tübingen and the Sorbonne. He lived in Menorca (1996-2005) and since 2005 he has lived in Potsdam.

== Works ==
- Schweizer Lexikon, 1991–1993,
- Weltreise, 1970–1974
- Gletscher, Schnee und Eis. Das Lexikon zu Glaziologie, Schnee- und Lawinenforschung in der Schweiz. 1993
- Diario del asedio de la fortaleza de San Felipe en la isla de Menorca, 2004
- Flügel der Ferne, 2017
- Zwischen Mond und ästhetischer Maschine, 2018
