= Samuel D. Schmucker =

American judge (1844–1911)

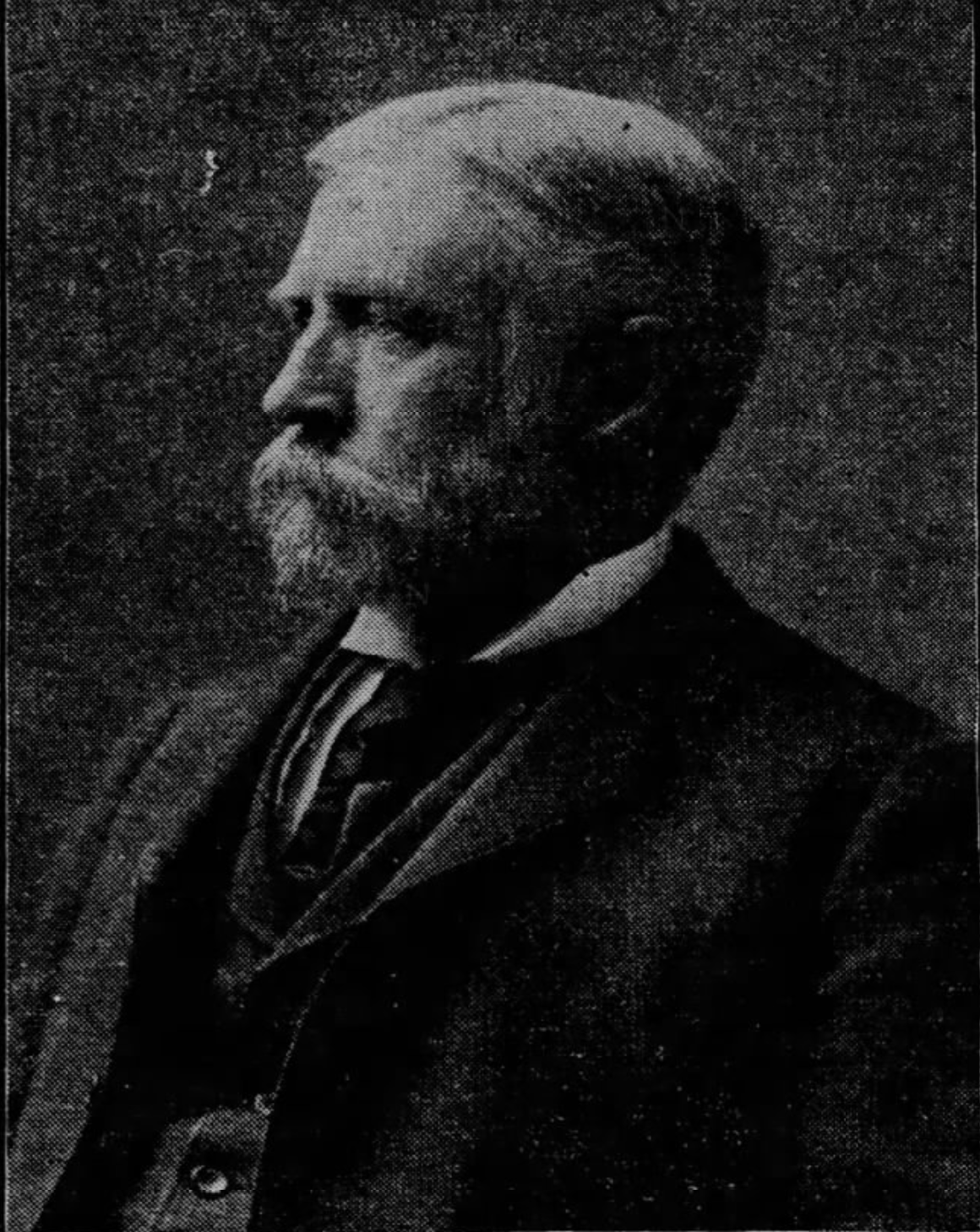
- Schmucker, c. 1901

Personal details
- Born: February 26, 1844 Gettysburg, Pennsylvania, U.S.
- Died: March 3, 1911 (aged 67) Baltimore, Maryland, U.S.
- Parent: Samuel Simon Schmucker (father)
- Education: Pennsylvania College; University of New York
- Occupation: Lawyer; judge
- Military career
- Allegiance: United States
- Branch: Union Army
- Rank: Sergeant
- Unit: 26th Pennsylvania Infantry Regiment
- Conflicts: American Civil War

Samuel D. Schmucker (February 26, 1844 – March 3, 1911) was an American lawyer, and was judge of the Maryland Court of Appeals from 1898 to 1911.

== Biography ==
Born at Gettysburg, Pennsylvania, the son of respected Lutheran theologian Samuel Simon Schmucker, Samuel D. Schmucker graduated from Pennsylvania College (now, Gettysburg College) in 1863. He served as a sergeant in the 26th Pennsylvania Regiment in the Union Army in the American Civil War. He received his law degree from the University of New York (now, NYU) in 1865. He practiced law for over 30 years in Baltimore, Maryland and served as president and trustees of various financial and charitable organizations before his appointment to the state's highest court in 1898. He died in Baltimore in 1911.
