= John George Schmucker =

John George Schmucker (German: Johann Georg Schmucker)
- Born: 18 August 1771; Michaelstadt, Darmstadt, Germany
- Died: 7 October 1854 (aged 83); Williamsburg, Pennsylvania, United States

Ecclesiastical career
- Title: Reverend

John George Schmucker (August 18, 1771 - October 9, 1854) was a German-American Lutheran clergyman.

== Biography ==
John George Schmucker was born at Michaelstadt in Hesse, Germany. His parents emigrated to the United States in 1785. After a residence of two years in Pennsylvania, the family settled near Woodstock, Virginia. In 1789 he began to study for the ministry. A year later he went to Philadelphia to continue his studies with Justus Henry Christian Helmuth and John Frederick Schmidt. He was licensed in 1793, and ordained in 1800. Beginning in 1794, he held several pastorates in and around Hagerstown, Maryland. In 1809, he was called to York, Pennsylvania, where he remained until failing health compelled him to retire in 1852. He then moved to Williamsburg, Pennsylvania, where several of his children resided, and there he remained during the rest of his life. In 1825 he received the degree of D.D. from the University of Pennsylvania.

Schmucker was a founder of the 1821 General Synod of the Lutheran Church in the United States and was on the 3-person Pennsylvania Ministerium committee that planned the 1826 Lutheran Theological Seminary at Gettysburg (his son, Samuel Simon Schmucker, was elected the 1st professor). He was also active in the establishment of Pennsylvania College (now Gettysburg College), and for more than twenty-one years was one of its trustees. For more than thirty years, he was one of the leaders of a Lutheran Church body in the United States, and actively engaged in all its important operations.

== Writings ==
Schmucker was a frequent contributor to periodicals, and a poet of merit. Among his works are:

- Vornehmste Weissagungen der Heiligen Schrift (The most prominent prophecies of holy scripture; Hagerstown, Maryland, 1807)
- Reformations-Geschichte zur Jubelfeier der Reformation (A history of the Reformation for its jubilee; York, Pennsylvania, 1817)
- Prophetic History of the Christian Religion, or Explanation of the Revelation of St. John (2 vols., Baltimore, 1817)
- Schwärmergeist unserer Tage entlarvt, zur Warnung erweckten Seelen (Enthusiastic spirits of our days unmasked to warn enlightened souls; York, Pa., 1827)
- Lieder-Anhang, zum Evang. Gesangbuch der General-Synode (Song appendix to the evangelical songbook of the General Synod; 1833)
- Wächterstimme an Zion's Kinder (Wake-up call to Zion's children; Gettysburg, Pennsylvania, 1838)

== Family ==
He married Elizabeth Gross (1771- 1820). They had 12 children. After her death, he married Anna Hoffman (1771-1854) in 1821. They had seven children.
