= Die Landstreicher =

1899 German operetta by C. M. Ziehrer

Die Landstreicher (The Tramps) is a German-language operetta in one prologue and two acts by Carl Michael Ziehrer to a libretto by Leopold Krenn and Karl Lindau. It was first performed on 26 July 1899 at the summer theatre "Venedig in Wien".

The premiere was just three weeks after the death of Johann Strauss II. Despite the Viennese mourning for their beloved composer, the operetta was especially noted for its Viennese spirit and more so with Ziehrer himself conducting, the review from the press was favorable with Ziehrer heralded as a new composer to usher in a new age. Die Landstreicher was the most popular of his stage works.

== Roles ==
Roles, voice types premiere cast
Role	Voice type	Premiere cast, 26 July 1899 Conductor: Carl Michael Ziehrer
Berta Fliederbusch, tramp	soprano	Poldi Augustin
August Fliederbusch, her husband, also a tramp	tenor	Franz Glawatsch
Mimi, a dancer	soprano	
Prince Adolar Gilka	tenor or baritone	Siegmund Steiner
Anna Gratwohl	soprano	
'Gerichtsassessor' Roland	tenor	Rudolf del Zopp
Lieutenant Mucki von Rodenstein	mezzo-soprano or tenor	Ludmilla Gaston
Lieutenant Rudi von Muggenheim	soprano or baritone	Anton Matscheg
Kampel, a court usher	bass	Max Schönau
Gratwohl, an inn-keeper, Anna's father	baritone or bass	Vali Paak
Leitgeb, a hotelier	baritone	
Frau Leitgeb	contralto	
Stöber, conductor of a male choir	tenor or baritone	
Lajos von Geletneky, a painter	tenor or baritone	
Dancers, parlour maids, waiters, peasants, summer visitors, singers, costumed guests etc.

== Adaptations ==
The libretto for Die Landstreicher was the basis for Ludwig Engländer's Broadway musical The Strollers which was staged at the Knickerbocker Theatre in 1901.

A film was made in 1937 directed by Karel Lamač with a script by Géza von Cziffra. It starred Paul Hörbiger, Rudolf Carl, Lucie Englisch, Erika Drusovich and Rudolf Platte. Further film versions were made for the Austrian broadcaster ORF in 1960 and again in 1968 in a co-production of ORF and the German broadcaster ZDF.
