= Samuel Mosheim Schmucker =

American historian

Samuel Mosheim Schmucker or Smucker (January 12, 1823 – May 12, 1863) was an American historical writer and popular biographer.

== Biography ==
Born at New Market, Virginia, the son of respected Lutheran pastor Samuel Simon Schmucker, Samuel Schmucker graduated from Phillips Academy, Andover, Massachusetts, in 1839 and Washington College in Pennsylvania in 1840 and became a Lutheran pastor in the Pennsylvania Ministerium. Schmucker held pastorates at Lewistown (1842–45) and Germantown, Pennsylvania (1845–48).

Schmucker left the ministry in 1848, studied law, and practiced in Philadelphia (1850–53). After two years in New York, he returned to Philadelphia and devoted his remaining years to writing, mostly popular biographies. According to the National Cyclopaedia of American Biography, Schmucker's works "exhibit diligence in compiling rather than deep research."

A fierce critic of the Higher Critic David Friedrich Strauss and his fellow "Modern Infidels," Schmucker unwittingly anticipated the Shakespearean authorship question with a mocking demonstration that "historic doubts regarding Christ" were "equally applicable to Shakespeare." Although he never doubted that Shakespeare had written Shakespeare, the 25-year-old Schmucker "carefully mapped out almost all the arguments subsequently used to question Shakespeare's authorship."

Schmucker died in Philadelphia on May 12, 1863.

== Publications ==
- Historic Doubts Respecting Shakespeare, Illustrating Infidel Objections Against the Bible (1848, 1853)
- Court and Reign of Catherine II, Empress of Russia (1855)
- Life of John C. Frémont, with his Explorations (1856)
- Life and Times of Alexander Hamilton (1856)
- Life and Times of Thomas Jefferson (1857)
- Arctic Explorations and Discoveries (1857)
- The Yankee Slave-Driver (1857)
- "History of the Mormons" (1857)
- Life of Dr. Elisha Kent Kane and Other American Explorers (1858)
- Life and Times of Henry Clay (1859)
- History of All Religions (1859)
- Life and Times of George Washington (1860)
- Blue Laws of Connecticut (1860)
- History of the Modern Jews (1860)
- A History of the Civil War in the United States (volume i, 1862)
