= Samuel Simon Schmucker =

German-American Lutheran pastor and theologian

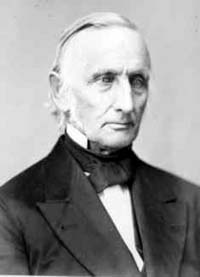
- Born: February 28, 1799; Hagerstown, Maryland, US
- Died: July 26, 1873 (aged 74); Gettysburg, Pennsylvania, US
- Education: Princeton Theological Seminary University of Pennsylvania
- Children: Samuel Mosheim; Samuel D.; Beale

Ecclesiastical career
- Church: Lutheran: Pennsylvania Ministerium; General Synod
- Writings: Definite Synodical Platform
- Offices held: President, Gettysburg Seminary; Founder, Gettysburg College
- Title: Ordained pastor

Samuel Simon Schmucker (February 28, 1799 – July 26, 1873) was a German-American Lutheran pastor and theologian. He was integral to the founding of the Lutheran church body known as the General Synod, as well as the oldest continuously operating Lutheran seminary (Gettysburg Seminary) and college in North America (Gettysburg College).

Later in his career, Schmucker became a controversial figure because of his theological positions, in particular his approach to the Lutheran Confessions. Outside of the church, Schmucker was a noted abolitionist.

== Early life ==
Samuel Simon Schmucker was born in 1799 in Hagerstown, Maryland. His father, Johann Georg Schmucker, was a German immigrant and an ordained pastor in the Pennsylvania Ministerium. Samuel Schmucker showed a promising intellect at a young age, and entered the University of Pennsylvania at age 15.

After teaching briefly at the York Academy, Schmucker went on a missionary journey to the western frontier of Kentucky and Ohio. On his return he studied at Princeton Theological Seminary, and was ordained a Lutheran minister (1820). In 1820 he helped to establish the General Synod of the Lutheran Church in America, one of the first organizations of the American Lutheran church. From 1826 to 1864 he served as professor of didactic theology and chairman of the faculty in Gettysburg Seminary, of which he was one of the founders. Schmucker Hall on the campus was named in his honor. During the Battle of Gettysburg, Schmucker's house was used as a field hospital for soldiers of both armies. He was never compensated for the damages incurred.

His publication of 1838 prepared the way for the formation of the Evangelical Alliance, which was formed in Freemason's Hall, London, August 19–23, 1846. The American branch was organized in 1867. He was the leader of the low-church Lutheran party who were connected with the General Synod and was better known outside of his communion than any other Lutheran minister.

Schmucker had fervent anti-war convictions. In 1846 he was one of the few Lutheran leaders in America to publicly oppose the war with Mexico.

Schumcker's son Samuel Mosheim Schmucker (or Smucker) was a writer of popular biographies. His son Beale Melanchthon Schmucker was also a noted Lutheran clergyman. Schmucker is buried in Evergreen Cemetery (Gettysburg, Pennsylvania). Another son, Samuel D. Schmucker, enlisted in the 26th Pennsylvania Emergency Militia in the days prior to the Battle of Gettysburg, and was engaged in a brief skirmish against Confederates west of Gettysburg on June 26, 1863.

Schumcker was an advocate of theistic evolution.

== Objections to Samuel Simon Schmucker ==
Schmucker was a controversial theologian whom Confessional Lutherans viewed as a threat to American Lutheranism. They did not believe he was actually a Lutheran, but rather, a Reformed theologian working to form a union of American Lutheranism with non-Lutheran American Protestants. His plan to discard the Augsburg Confession as a declaration of Lutheran belief in favor of a confession compatible with Reformed theology alienated him from former allies. He published this altered confession anonymously, but it failed to pass even within his own church body.

Because Schmucker denied the Real Presence in the Lord's Supper, he is categorically placed in the "Un-Lutheran" camp by Charles Porterfield Krauth. Schmucker wrote, "worthy communicants, in this ordinance, by faith spiritually feed on the body and blood of the Redeemer, thus holding communion or fellowship with Him." This demonstrates Schmucker held to the Calvinist spiritual explanation of the Lord's Supper rather than the Lutheran teaching of Sacramental Union. Wilhelm Sihler of the Missouri Synod criticized Samuel Simon Schmucker, terming him "apostate," and asserting that Schmucker and other like-minded leaders of the General Synod were "open counterfeiters, Calvinists, Methodists, and Unionists...traitors and destroyers of the Lutheran Church".

The Schaff-Herzog Encyclopedia of Religious Knowledge states his theological position was a mix of "Puritanism, Pietism, and shallow Rationalism" rather than Lutheranism.

== Publications ==
His published works number more than one hundred. Among them are:

- Biblical Theology of Storr and Flatt, translated from the German (2 vols., Andover, 1826; reprinted in England, 1845)
- Elements of Popular Theology (1834)
- Kurzgefasste Geschichte der Christlichen Kirche, auf der Grundlage der Busch'en Werke (Gettysburg, Pennsylvania, 1834)
- Fraternal Appeal to the American Churches on Christian Union (Andover, 1838)
- Portraiture of Lutheranism (Baltimore, 1840)
- Retrospect of Lutheranism (1841)
- Psychology, or Elements of Mental Philosophy (New York, 1842)
- Dissertation on Capital Punishment (Philadelphia, 1845)
- The American Lutheran Church, Historically, Doctrinally, and Practically Delineated (1851)
- Lutheran Manual (1855)
- American Lutheranism Vindicated (Baltimore, 1856)
- The Lutheran Symbols (1856)
- Appeal on Behalf of the Christian Sabbath (Philadelphia, 1857)
- Evangelical Lutheran Catechism (Baltimore, 1859)
- The Church of the Redeemer as developed within the General Synod of the Evangelical Lutheran Church (1870)
- The Unity of Christ's Church (New York, 1870)

He wrote a large number of discourses and addresses, and articles in the Evangelical Review and other periodicals.
