= Carl Michael Ziehrer =

Austrian composer

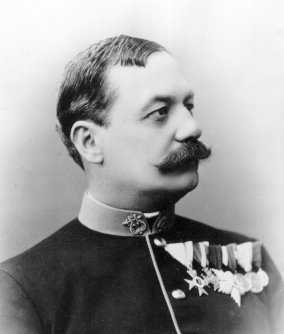
Karl Michael Ziehrer

Carl Michael Ziehrer (more rarely spelled Karl Michael Ziehrer) (2 May 1843 – 14 November 1922) was an Austrian composer. In his lifetime, he was one of the fiercest rivals of the Strauss family; most notably Johann Strauss II and Eduard Strauss.

== Biography ==
Born in Vienna, Ziehrer was taught music by Simon Sechter, a famous Viennese music theorist and pedagogue, and Johann Emanuel Hasel. He was soon discovered by music publisher Carl Haslinger, one of Johann Strauss II's publishers, who had fallen out with Strauss regarding the receipts from the latter's lucrative Russian venture.

Haslinger sought to promote his promising young ward, and on 21 November 1863 the young conductor appeared as the head of a newly formed orchestra aimed at toppling the Strauss dynasty at the Dianabad-Saal in Vienna. Not long after that, he secured a place at one of the Viennese military bands. As was the current trend, he took over as Kapellmeister of a large civilian orchestra in 1873. He also published the journal "Deutsche Musikzeitung" around the same time, and was credited as being one of the important sources of music study in the late 1870s.

Not long after founding the music journal, he changed his publisher to Döblinger, and toured Eastern Europe and Germany for many years, earning a good reputation as a strict yet efficient conductor. It was in 1881 that he met his future wife, Marianne Edelmann, a famous operetta singer, in Berlin.

Throughout the period between 1885 and 1893, Ziehrer toured extensively and was a military bandmaster, having assumed the direction of the "Militärmusik des Infanterieregiments Hoch- und Deutschmeister", as well as the "Deutschmeister" decoration. His fame was such that he was invited to perform at the World's Columbian Exposition in Chicago in 1893. After that, in a flurry of events, he toured 41 German cities and finally returned to Vienna, where he formed an even larger and successful orchestra that specialized in playing dance music. At this point, his works began to gain a wider circulation among the music-loving Viennese and work such as "Weaner Mad’ln", Op. 388, as well as the more famous "Wiener Bürger", Op. 419, were received with greater appreciation, the latter even temporarily triumphing over Strauss compositions when first published in 1890.

Despite being a strong challenger of the Strauss music dynasty, he was unable to triumph over them and remained under their influence, which numbered among them his personal appearance; he maintained a "Schnurrbart" (moustache) as well as a similar hair-style. By the turn of the century, Ziehrer felt that he needed to devote his time and attention towards composing, and his military band participation waned until he relinquished his last position in 1899, the year Johann Strauss II died.

Ziehrer enjoyed success in the operetta writing business, with stage works such as Die Landstreicher in 1899, but it was with the operetta Fremdenführer (Tourist Guide) that he achieved stage success. He was one of the composers who bridged the 'Golden Age' of operetta with the new influence of the emerging 'Silver Age', with composers such as Franz Lehár, who would dominate the operetta scene for many years later on.

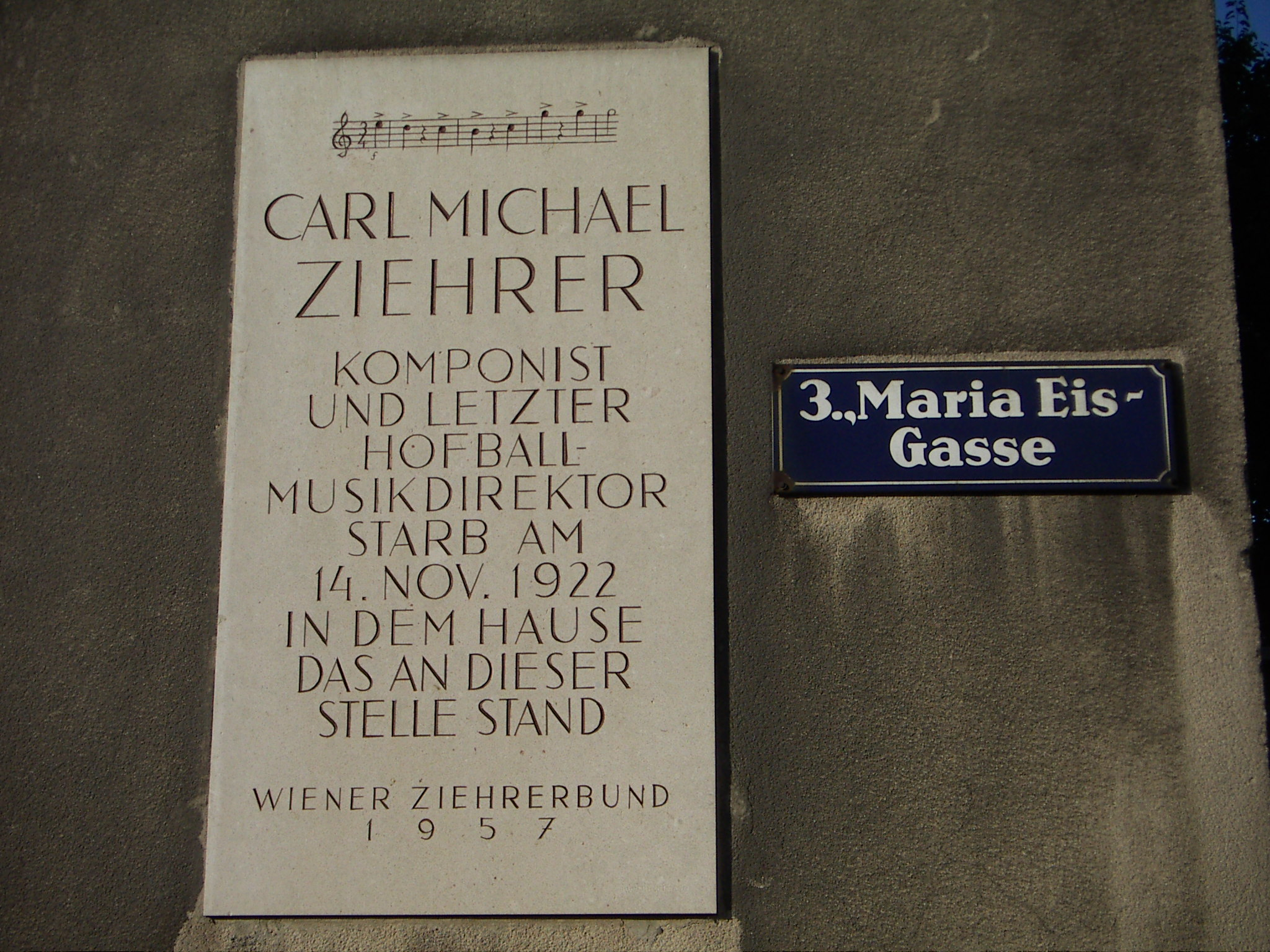
A plaque commemorating Ziehrer. The first few bars of his best-known composition, Wiener Bürger, are inscribed at the top

In 1909, he was awarded the honorary post of the 'KK Hofballmusikdirektor', which was created for Johann Strauss I more than half a century earlier, and subsequently dominated within the Strausses with Johann Strauss II and Eduard Strauss also holding the office for many years. He was also the last person to hold this post, with the destruction of the Habsburg dynasty in World War I resulting in its dissolution. During the time before the war, he worked well with composers Franz Lehár, Oscar Straus, and Leo Fall, and was guest conductor at their concerts on many occasions.

The outbreak of the war sealed his career as a composer, and most of his property was destroyed. He died a poor and forgotten man on 14 November 1922 in Vienna probably of a stroke. He was buried in the Zentralfriedhof in the graves of honour. His wife was buried beside him.

His rich musical heritage may not be comparable to the Strausses, who dominated for well over a century, but he was more prolific, having composed over 600 waltzes, polkas and marches, which are still performed today. Some of his works are even more Viennese in nature than that of the Strausses. His works are vigorous and forceful, with cheerful melodies written even near the end of the Habsburg dynasty.

Ziehrer was the subject of 1945 biopic Viennese Girls and was played by Willi Forst who also directed the film.

== Works ==
- List of dances and marches by Carl Michael Ziehrer
- List of operettas by Carl Michael Ziehrer

== See also ==
- Peter Zauner (composer)
