= List of classical piano duos (performers) =

The term piano duo can refer both to a genre of music, written for two pianists to play at either one or two pianos, or to the two pianists themselves.

This is a list of notable performers who appeared as piano duos in classical music. Most of these pianists performed works for piano four-hands (two pianists at one piano; also known as piano duet) as well as works for two pianos, often with orchestras or chamber ensembles. Some of these teams focussed exclusively or predominantly on this repertoire, but some also appeared separately as solo pianists.

Some piano duos appear under a single name (such as the Long Island Piano Duo), or a unified name (such as Nettle & Markham), but the majority simply use both their names (such as Katia and Marielle Labèque or Bracha Eden and Alexander Tamir).

People in this list should not be added to List of classical pianists unless they also had significant careers as solo pianists. However, if they recorded music requiring two pianists, they should be added to List of classical pianists (recorded).

== List of classical piano duos ==
Sorting note
The main entry is sorted by the pianist whose surname appears earlier in the alphabet, and the other pianist is cross-referenced in smaller type. Where their names are usually referred to in a different order, or they use a special name for their duo, that entry appears in the 2nd column.

Members	Name of duo (where relevant)	Notes and references
Saar Ahuvia; Stephanie Kai-Win Ho	Duo: Stephanie & Saar	
James D'Leon; Alwen Yeung	Duo Fuerza	
Millette Alexander; Frank Daykin	Alexander and Daykin	
Arthur Ancelle; Ludmila Berlinskaya	Duo Berlinskaya-Ancelle	
Vera Appleton; Michael Field	Appleton and Field	Alan Hovhaness wrote his Symphony No. 45, Op. 342 (1954) for them, but they never played it.
Veronika Aptekar-Ainagulov; Svetlana Aptekar-Ainagulov	NikaSveta (Svetlana & Veronika Aptekar-Ainagulov)	Russian: Светлана и Вероника Аптекарь-Айнагуловы.
Martha Argerich; Nelson Freire		
Vladimir Ashkenazy; André Previn	seen in either order	
Victor Babin; Vitya Vronsky	Vronsky & Babin	
Naïri Badal; Adélaïde Panaget	Duo Játékok	
Alexander Bakhchiev; Elena Sorokina	Elena Sorokina and Alexander Bakhchiev	
Jean-Jacques Balet; Mayumi Kameda		
Ethel Bartlett; Rae Robertson	Bartlett and Robertson	
Aglaia Bätzner; Cristina Marton		
Harold Bauer; Ossip Gabrilowitsch	seen in either order	
David Bradshaw; Cosmo Buono	Bradshaw-Buono Duo	Discography includes: Liszt's Hungarian Rhapsody No. 2, Fest-Polonaise, The Entrance of the Guests to the Wartburg, Benediction and Sermon, March and Cavatina and Fantasy and Fugue on the Chorale 'Ad nos, Ad Salutarem undam'.
Clara Becker; Marie Becker	Clara and Marie Becker	They have been the dedicatees of several compositions among them works written by German composers Birgitta Lutz and Mathias Christian Kosel and are currently collaborating on commissions with the Greek composer Andreas Foivos Apostolou as well as the award winning composer Gonzalo Grau.
Elizabeth Bergmann; Marcel Bergmann	Bergmann Duo	
Lidija Bizjak; Sanja Bizjak	Bizjak Piano Duo	
Hélène Boschi; Germaine Mounier	Duo Boschi-Mounier	"Debussy, Clementi, Mozart, Busoni : Musique pour 2 pianos / vol.2 : En blanc et noir - Sonate / op. 12 n° 5 - Sonate / K. 448 - Fantasia contrappuntistica (recorded in France, REM)
Vittorio Bresciani; Francesco Nicolosi	Franz Liszt Piano Duo	They have recorded Bresciani's arrangement of Liszt's Dante Sonata, and Liszt's arrangement of the Dante Symphony.
Ralph Markham; Kenneth Broadway	Ralph Markham & Kenneth Broadway	Recorded the Concerto For Two Pianos by Vaughan Williams for Virgin Classics, and Carnival of the Animals by Saint-Saens for Telarc Records. Toured Europe and North America with the Philharmonia Hungarica in performances of concertos by Francis Poulenc and Mozart at Lincoln Centre and the Kennedy Center. They made their Town Hall debut in March 1988.
Jeremy Brown; Seta Tanyel		Recorded Poulenc's complete music for 2 pianists.
Lyubov Bruk; Mark Taimanov	seen in either order	
Antoinette Cann; Claire Cann	Cann Twins	
Carles Lama; Sofia Cabruja	Carles and Sofia piano duo	
Josee Caron; Carmen Picard	Duo Caron	Artists dedicated mainly to their own transcriptions or arrangements of masterful orchestral works such as Italian Symphony by F.-B. Mendelssohn, Till Eulenspiegel's Merry Pranks by Richard Strauss, etc. Recordings and numerous world premieres including original arrangements by Sir Paul McCartney
Robert Casadesus; Gaby Casadesus		
Valeria Szervánszky; Ronald Cavaye		
Abram Chasins; Constance Keene	seen in either order	
William Chapman Nyaho, Susanna Garcia	Nyaho/Garcia Duo	Recorded Aaron Copland's complete Music for Two Pianos. Several world premiere recordings: Eleanor Alberga, Two-Piano Suite and 3-Day Mix; Thomas H. Kerr Jr., Concert Scherzo: Didn't My Lord Deliver Daniel?; Stella Sung: Epicycles.
Angela Cheng; Alvin Chow		
Caroline Clemmow; Anthony Goldstone	Goldstone and Clemmow	Made the world premiere recording of the two-piano arrangement of Grieg's Concerto in A minor, written by Grieg and Károly Thern. Also the first recording of Grieg's piano version of the "Homage March" from Sigurd Jorsalfar. They have recorded the piano duet version of Chopin's 2nd Piano Concerto in F minor (arr. Chopin and Carl Mikuli)
Mark Clinton; Nicole Narboni	Clinton/Narboni Duo	
John Contiguglia; Richard Contiguglia	Richard and John Contiguglia	Made the first recording of Beethoven's 9th Symphony in the two-piano transcription by Franz Liszt; revived Victor Babin's Concerto for Two Pianos and Orchestra; gave New York premiere of Max Bruch's Concerto for Two Pianos and Orchestra in A flat minor; made many world premiere recordings of works by Liszt and Bartók.
Romola Costantino; Lance Dossor		
Francesco De Stefano; Vincenzo De Stefano	De Stefano Piano Duo	
Larissa Dedova; Mikhail Volchok		
Luis del Valle; Victor del Valle	Victor and Luis del Valle	
Cipa Dichter; Misha Dichter		
Liuben Dimitrov; Aglika Genova	Genova & Dimitrov	Made world premiere recording of the complete piano duo works of Shostakovitch.
Leo van Doeselaar; Wyneke Jordans	Jordans & Van Doeselaar Piano Duo	
Clément Doucet; Jean Wiener	Wiener et Doucet	
Dubravka Vukalović Vlahek; Bruno Vlahek	D&B Duo	
Bracha Eden; Alexander Tamir	Bracha Eden and Alexander Tamir	
Monika Egri; Attila Pertis	Duo Egri and Pertis	
Irina Elkina; Julia Elkina		
Sebastian Euler; Shao-Yin Huang	Duo d´Accord	Made the premiere recording of Clara Schumann's arrangement for piano 4-hands of Robert Schumann's Piano Quintet in E flat, Op. 44.
Lindley Evans; Frank Hutchens		
Kevin Farrell; Steven Worbey	Worbey & Farrell Piano Duo	
Giorgi Latso; Anna Fedorova-Latso	The Latsos Piano Duo	Individually, Anna Fedorova-Latso from Russia, and Giorgi Latso from Tbilisi, Georgia, are piano virtuosos on the international classical music scene, who have performed in recitals, chamber ensembles, and have performed with leading orchestras worldwide. They just released their first recording with Vienna Acoustics, works by Mozart and Schubert.
Arthur Ferrante; Louis Teicher	Ferrante & Teicher	
Jacques Février; Francis Poulenc		
Robert Fizdale; Arthur Gold	Gold and Fizdale	
Helen Fogel; Karl Ulrich Schnabel		
Claude Frank; Lillian Kallir		
Irwin Freundlich; Lillian Freundlich	Lillian and Irwin Freundlich	
Takashi Fujii; Yoshie Shiramizu-Fujii	Yoshie and Takashi	
Ute Gareis; Klaus-Georg Pohl	Gareis & Pohl	European premiere of J.Adams "Hallelujah junction" (2000)
Sarah Gibson; Thomas Kotcheff	HOCKET	Contemporary music piano duo
Rhondda Gillespie; Robert Weatherburn		
Arianna Goldina; Remy Loumbrozo	Goldina & Loumbrozo	
Nadya Gordon; Steven Gordon		
Bradford Gowen; Maribeth Gowen	Maribeth and Bradford Gowen	
Polina Grigoryeva; Yulia Yurchenko	Piano Duo Vis-à-vis	
Andreas Groethuysen; Yaara Tal	Duo Tal & Groethuysen	
Roberto Guerra; Margherita Malagoli	Margherita Malagoli and Roberto Guerra	
Thomas Hecht; Sandra Shapiro	Thomas Hecht and Sandra Shapiro	
Ákos Hernádi; Károly Mocsári	Hernádi-Mocsári Piano Duo	Recorded works by Bartók, including a duo-piano arrangement of The Miraculous Mandarin.
Cara Hesse; Laura Pauna		
Norman Horowitz; Melvin Stecher	Stecher and Horowitz Piano Duo	
Olga Hoteeva; Andrej Hoteev		Made the world premiere recording of 22 unknown original transcriptions by Sergei Rachmaninoff for piano for four hands after Tchaikovsky's The Sleeping Beauty.
Richard Humburger; Valentin Humburger	Piano Duo Humburger	
Amparo Iturbi; José Iturbi	José & Ámparo Iturbi	
Christian Ivaldi; Noël Lee	Ivaldi and Lee	
Michael Jamanis; Frances Veri	Frances Veri and Michael Jamanis	
Dorothy Jonas; Joshua Pierce		
Geneviève Joy; Jacqueline Robin	Jacqueline Robin and Genevieve Joy	
Alfred Kanwischer; Heidi Kanwischer	Heidi and Alfred Kanwischer	
Andrey Kasparov; Oksana Lutsyshyn	Invencia Piano Duo	In collaboration with Naxos Records, on its Grand Piano series, they have released four CDs of Florent Schmitt's complete duo-piano works.
Igor Machlak; Olga Kharitonova	Igor and Olga Machlak	
Beatriz Klien; Walter Klien	Walter and Beatriz Klien	
Christian Köhn; Silke-Thora Matthies		Recorded 17 CDs of all Brahms's arrangements for piano 4-hands or 2 pianos (mostly of his own music, but including Schumann's Piano Quintet in E flat.
Alfons Kontarsky; Aloys Kontarsky	seen in either order	They have given first performances of works by Luciano Berio, Sylvano Bussotti, Mauricio Kagel, Karlheinz Stockhausen, Henri Pousseur, Luis de Pablo and Bernd Alois Zimmermann.
Irina Kotlyar; Gregory Shifrin	Kotlyar-Shifrin Piano Duo	
Mina Kusumoto; Laurie Kono Merchant	Koshka Piano Duo	
Aleksei Kuznetsoff; Valentina Lisitsa	Valentina Lisista and Alexei Kuznetsoff	
Katia Labèque; Marielle Labèque	Labèque Sisters	
Walter Landauer; Marjan Rawicz	Rawicz and Landauer	Played mainly light classics and arrangements of existing works.
Vlastimil Lejsek; Vera Lejskova		
Josef Lhévinne; Rosina Lhévinne		
Matteo Liva; Michelangelo Stregapede	Piano Duo Liva-Stregapede	They play unusual repertoire such as Saint-Saëns' 2-piano arrangement of Liszt's Sonata in B minor, and Shostakovich's arrangement of Honegger's Symphony No. 3; performed world premieres of works by Ástor Piazzolla, unpublished versions for 2 pianos and a version for piano duo by Casella of Beethoven's 9 symphonies, and Tchaikovsky's Pathetique Symphony.
Vassili Lobanov; Sviatoslav Richter	Sviatoslav Richter and Vassili Lobanov	
Sonja Lončar; Andrija Pavlović	LP Piano Duo	
Beatrice Long; Christina Long	Long Duo Piano	
James Longford; Lindy Tennent-Brown	Longford-Brown Piano Duo	
Jack Lowe; Arthur Austin Whittemore	Whittemore and Lowe	
Pierre Luboshutz; Genia Nemenoff	Luboshutz and Nemenoff	
Brenda Lucas; John Ogdon		
Radu Lupu; Murray Perahia	seen in either order	
Witold Lutosławski; Andrzej Panufnik		
Margarita Malinova; Olga Malinova		
Richard Markham; David Nettle	Nettle & Markham	In 1985 they gave the UK premiere of Bruch's Double Concerto. They were the first duo to give concert performances of The Planets in Holst's own two-piano version.
Jeffrey Marlowe; Ronald Marlowe	Marlowe Brothers	
Guy Meier; Lee Pattison	Meier & Pattison	In 1924 they gave the American premiere of Leo Sowerby's Ballade for Two Pianos and Orchestra (King Estmere) with the Rochester Philharmonic Orchestra conducted by Albert Coates in New York. Sowerby also made a 2-piano version of the first of his two Paul Whiteman Orchestra commissions, Synconata, for the duo, as well as his Graingeresque Fisherman's Tune.
Yaltah Menuhin; Joel Ryce-Menuhin		The first duo to record the entire works for piano duo/duet by Mozart.
Dominique Morel; Douglas Nemish	Morel-Nemish Duo	
Anne-Marie Mot; Monique Mot		
Begonia Uriarte Mrongovius; Karl-Hermann Mrongovius		
Christina Naughton; Michelle Naughton		The twin-sister piano duo are graduates of the Juilliard School and the Curtis Institute of Music, where they were each awarded the Festorazzi Prize. They are Steinway Artists and currently reside in New York City. Christina and Michelle Naughton’s first album was released on the label ORFEO in 2012.
Harry Neal; Allison Nelson	Nelson and Neal	
Max Olding; Pamela Page	seen in either order	
Ferhan Önder; Ferzan Önder	Ferhan and Ferzan Önder	Turkish-Austrian pianists, born October 2, 1965. Moved to Austria in 1985 to study in Vienna.
Anthony Paratore; Joseph Paratore	Anthony & Joseph Paratore	William Bolcom wrote his Sonata in One Movement for them; they premiered Alban Berg's transcription of Arnold Schoenberg's Chamber Symphony, Op. 9; Dave Brubeck entrusted his original two-piano music to them and they premiered his "Points on Jazz".
Güher Pekinel; Süher Pekinel	Pekinel sisters or Güher and Süher Pekinel	Identical twins (born 1951, Istanbul), made their debut at the age of six. Recorded the four hand reduction of Stravinsky's The Rite of Spring for Deutsche Grammophon in 1980.
Mary Peppin; Geraldine Peppin	Mary and Geraldine Peppin	They were identical twins, born 30 December 1912 in Somerset. Premieres included Stanley Bate's Three Pieces for Two Pianos, Arnold Cooke's Sonata for Two Pianos, Peter Racine Fricker's Concertante for Three Pianos (with additional pianist Kyla Greenbaum), Constant Lambert's Trois Pieces Negres, Humphrey Searle's Gold Coast Customs and Bernard Stevens' Introduction and Allegro.
Maxim Puryzhinskiy; Irina Silivanova	Irina and Maxim	
Janine Reding; Henry Piette	Reding–Piette Piano Duo	
Imre Rohmann; András Schiff	Schiff and Rohmann	
Joan Rowland; Karl Ulrich Schnabel		Schnabel formed this duo after the death of his first duo partner, his wife Helen Fogel (see Helen Fogel, Karl-Ulrich Schnabel)
Milton Salkind; Peggy Salkind		
Naomi Sanchez; Stephen Varney	Pas de Duo	
Dinis Schemann; Susanne Schemann	Susanne and Dinis Schemann	
Phyllis Sellick; Cyril Smith	Cyril Smith and Phyllis Sellick	Malcolm Arnold, Lennox Berkeley, Arthur Bliss, Gordon Jacob and Ralph Vaughan Williams all wrote concertos for them.
Stanislava Varshavski; Diana Shapiro	Piano Duo Varshavski and Shapiro	
Sivan Silver; Gil Garburg	Silver-Garburg Piano Duo	
Sontraud Speidel; Evelinde Trenkner	Trenkner-Speidel Piano Duo	They have made world premiere CD recordings of Max Reger's arrangements of Bach's works.
Hans-Peter Stenzl; Volker Stenzl	Stenzl Piano Duo	
Shan-shan Sun; Per Tengstrand	Tengstrand-Sun Piano Duo	
Ottilie Sutro; Rose Sutro	Rose and Ottilie Sutro	The Sutro sisters have been described as "the world's first recognised duo-piano team", but Willi and Louis Thern preceded them by almost 30 years. Max Bruch wrote his Concerto for Two Pianos and Orchestra in A flat minor for them, but they never played it in its original form.
Alfred Teltschik; Herbert Teltschik	Teltschik Brothers	
Louis Thern; Willi Thern	Willi and Louis Thern	Appeared in Europe from 1866.
Joan Trimble; Valerie Trimble	Trimble Sisters	Arthur Benjamin wrote his best-known work, Jamaican Rhumba, for them.
Anne-Louise Turgeon; Edward Turgeon	Duo Turgeon	
Vlada Vassilieva; Anatoly Zatin	Duo Petrof	
Susan Wang; Sarah Wang		
Irina Zheleznov; Maxim Zheleznov	Duo Zheleznov	
