= Mary and Geraldine Peppin =

British twin sister classical piano duo

Mary and Geraldine Peppin (born 30 December 1912) were identical twin sisters, and performers in a classical piano duo active in the UK from the 1930s until the 1960s. Later in life they both became influential piano teachers at the Guildhall School of Music. Geraldine died in December 1980 and Mary died on 8 August 1989.

== Early career and wartime ==
The twins were born in Marston Magna, Somerset where their father, the Reverend Gilbert Peppin, was the vicar and a folk song collector. Their uncle and first music teacher was the Reverend Arthur H Peppin, who had been a pupil of Hubert Parry at the Royal College of Music and went on to become the first director of music at Clifton College in 1896. He was later director of music at Rugby School (where his pupils included Robin Milford). Peppin was also a close friend of Stephen Spender's father Harold. The twins subsequently continued lessons with Mabel Lander, a pupil of Leschetizky and much later piano tutor to the young Princess Elizabeth.

Their debut recital took place on 25 October 1930 at the Grotrian Hall, including pieces by J. S. Bach, Schumann, Arensky and Bax. There followed many public recitals and BBC broadcasts until the war interrupted things. During the war they played on behalf of CEMA (the wartime Council for the Encouragement of Music and the Arts) and ENSA (the Entertainments National Service Association), and substituted for unavailable orchestras in many theatre and ballet pits - including the Ballet Rambert, for which Mary played with Angus Morrison, and the Sadler's Wells Ballet, for which Geraldine played with Constant Lambert.

Geraldine met the poet Randall Swingler in 1931 and married him on 17 April 1933 at St Mary Magdalene's Church, Munster Square. They had a son and a daughter (Judith) who married the composer Edward Williams. Mary Peppin married Wing Commander Paddy Fisher (later Dr R.E.W Fisher) in 1943. Both husbands were left wing activists. Mary and Geraldine were also deeply involved in left-wing political organizations in the 1930s and 40s, accompanying choirs for the Workers' Musical Association, and among the many other artists and musicians involved with the Unity Theatre, King's Cross and in the Hampstead communist party branch. The only recordings they left were arrangements of workers songs for two pianos made by their composer friends Alan Bush and Alan Rawsthorne on Topic Records. In his book Churchill's Spy Files, Nigel West reports that the Peppins' flat in Islington (at 9b Canonbury Square) was a centre for clandestine communist activity during the war and was under surveillance.

== Post war ==
After the war the piano duo partnership continued with great critical success. Pianist and contemporary James Gibb said of them: "Their ensemble was as near perfection as I have ever heard in duo-playing". Their repertoire included all the great two-piano works, such as Mozart's D major Sonata, the Brahms F minor Sonata and Debussy's En blanc et noir. But they also championed works by contemporary British composers, including Stanley Bate's Three Pieces for Two Pianos, Arnold Cooke's Sonata for Two Pianos, Peter Racine Fricker's Concertante for Three Pianos (with additional pianist Kyla Greenbaum), Constant Lambert's Trois Pieces Negres and Humphrey Searle's Gold Coast Customs, the latter two at the same concert on 17 May 1949, held at BBC Broadcasting House.

The sisters also knew and worked with the composers Alan Bush, Alan Rawsthorne, Bernard Stevens, John Sykes and Phyllis Tate. Bernard Stevens wrote two works for the duo: Introduction and Allegro (which they premiered in 1957) and A Birthday Song (1963), with its theme derived from their names. Stevens also wrote his Elegiac Fugue on the name 'Geraldine' (1981) in memory of Geraldine. In 1959 the sisters performed the Hungarian composer Pál Járdányi's Sonata for Two Pianos (1942) in its first UK and broadcast performance.

From the early 1960s, the sisters both joined the staff at the Guildhall School of Music, teaching piano. Their pupils included Elizabeth Dunn and John E. Keane (Geraldine), and Simon Kent (Mary) among many others. They were both living close to each other in Pebmarsh, Essex towards the end of their lives. Geraldine died in December 1980 and Mary nine years later in August 1989. They left no significant recordings, and broadcasting archives have not survived.

== Other piano duos ==
Piano duos contemporary with the Peppin Sisters included Rose and Ottilie Sutro, Bartlett and Robertson, Doris Arnold and Harry Pepper, Rawicz and Landauer, Phyllis Sellick & Cyril Smith, and Joan and Valerie Trimble.

Other twin sister piano duos include the Pekinel sisters (born 1951), Claire and Antoinette Cann (born 1963), Ferhan & Ferzan Önder (born 1965), Christina and Michelle Naughton (born 1988), Ani and Nia Sulkhanishvili (born 1988) and Marianna and Stephanie Kapsetaki (born 1991).
