= Piano duo (disambiguation) =

Piano duo often distinguishes a duet for two players at two pianos from a piano duet for two players at a single instrument playing piano four hands. It may also refer to:

- List of classical piano duos (performers), i.e. a group consisting of two pianists
- List of compositions for piano duo, i.e. a piece for two pianists
