= Christina and Michelle Naughton =

- Born: Princeton, New Jersey
- Genres: Classical, Contemporary Classical Music
- Instrument: Piano
- Years active: 2008 - present
- Members: Christina Naughton; Michelle Naughton

Christina and Michelle Naughton are twin sisters and an American piano duo.

== Early life and education ==
Christina and Michelle Naughton were born in Princeton, New Jersey, on September 2, 1988, to parents of European and Chinese ancestry. Raised in Madison, Wisconsin, they began taking piano lessons from their mother at the age of four. Although the sisters initially practiced and performed individually, a concert presenter's request that they perform together as a duo when they were 18 highlighted their remarkable talent and marked the beginning of a preference for making music together.

The sisters were trained at the Curtis Institute of Music and at the Juilliard School. They earned bachelor's degrees in solo piano performance in 2011 at Curtis, where they both received the Festorazzi Prize. They earned master's degrees from Juilliard in 2013. Pianist Joseph Kalichstein taught the sisters at Juilliard and remarked, "When they play together, they seem to have one mind and one body—it's extraordinary—like one person with two hands playing."

== Career ==
The Naughtons' professional career was launched in 2010 with debuts at the Kennedy Center in Washington, DC, and the Mann Center for Performing Arts with the Philadelphia Orchestra, after which The Philadelphia Inquirer described them as "paired to perfection". In 2011, they performed in Munich's Herkulessaal and began to establish their reputation outside of the United States.

Subsequently, the Naughtons performed with the Philadelphia Orchestra, Houston Symphony, the New Jersey Symphony Orchestra, Nashville Symphony, the Buffalo Philharmonic, the Hong Kong Philharmonic, the Mahler Chamber Orchestra, the Royal Flemish Philharmonic, and the Solistes Européens Luxembourg, under conductors including Stéphane Denève, Edo de Waart, Charles Dutoit, JoAnn Falletta, Giancarlo Guerrero, Andrés Orozco-Estrada and Michael Stern.

The sisters' recital appearances have included the Schubert Club of St. Paul, the Naumburg Orchestral Concerts in 2014, in the Naumburg Bandshell, Central Park, in the summer series, Chamber Music San Francisco, the Houston Society for the Performing Arts, the Chamber Music Society of Detroit, Munich's Gasteig, the Berlin Philharmonie's Kammermusiksaal, France's Festival de La Roque-d'Anthéron, Zurich's Tonhalle, and Prague's Strings of Autumn Festival.

In 2019, Christina and Michelle became the first piano duo to receive Lincoln Center's Avery Fisher Career Grant. They reside in New York City. In March, 2025, the Duo canceled all present and future engagements with no explanation given.

== Discography ==
The Naughtons released their first album, "Piano Duets," on the German label Orfeo in 2012. It was praised by Der Spiegel for a performance that "stands out with unique harmony and sings out with stylistic confidence." The sisters signed an exclusive recording contract with Warner Classics which released their second album, "Visions", in March 2016; and their third album "American Postcard" in March 2019.

== Music videos ==
- Lutoslawski
- Mozart 2009
- Felix Mendelssohn Bartholdy's Allegro brilliant A major (excerpt)
- Naumburg-Hallelujah Junction
- Adams / Arr. Antonsen: Short Ride in a Fast Machine

== See also ==
- Mary and Geraldine Peppin
- Claire and Antoinette Cann
- Ferhan & Ferzan Önder
- Pekinel sisters
