= Thern =

Thern is a surname. Notable people with the surname include:

- Jonas Thern (born 1967), Swedish association football manager and former professional player who played as a midfielder
- Károly Thern (1817–1886), Hungarian composer, pianist, conductor and arranger
- Simon Thern (born 1992), Swedish footballer, and son of Jonas Thern
- Willi and Louis Thern: Willi (1847–1911) and Louis (1848–1920), Hungarian pianists and teachers

== See also ==
- Thern Promontory, high ice-covered promontory at the south end of Eisenhower Range in Victoria Land
- Therns, manipulating and secretive fictional alien race on the planet of Barsoom (Mars) in the novel A Princess of Mars by Edgar Rice Burroughs
- Thearne
- Thurne
- Thürnen
