= Anthony & Joseph Paratore =

American piano duo

- Education: Juilliard School
- Occupation: Piano duo
- Awards: ARD International Music Competition 1974

Anthony & Joseph Paratore is an internationally known classical piano duo, formed by the brothers Anthony Paratore (born 17 June 1944) and Joseph Paratore (born 19 March 1948). The pianists have performed and recorded most of the classical repertoire for two pianos and four-hand piano, including works with orchestra and arrangements of works for orchestra. In the field of jazz they have collaborated with Dave Brubeck.

== Career ==
Anthony and Joseph Paratore were born in Boston in a musical family of Italian origin. They studied on scholarships at both Boston University and the Juilliard School, with Rosina Lhévinne. Anthony graduated from Boston University's School of Music in 1966, Joseph in 1970. Each began performing as a soloist. Joseph had his debut with the Boston Symphony Orchestra, aged 17. Anthony toured South America. Their teacher at Juilliard had urged them to play as a duo, because she had observed that they "gave the impression of breathing together".

In 1974, they won first prize at the ARD International Music Competition, as the first piano duo to do so.

In 1987, they premiered Alban Berg's transcription of Arnold Schoenberg's Chamber Symphony, Op. 9, which had been "considered too difficult" when it was written. They recorded it along with Berg's transcriptions of his own string quartet, Op. 3.

In 1988, they played one of the 19 concerts of the first season of the Rheingau Musik Festival at Schloss Johannisberg. On 27 August they played the Sonata for Two Pianos in F minor, Op. 34b, by Johannes Brahms, an earlier version of his Piano Quintet, Claude Debussy's arrangement of his Prélude à l'après-midi d'un faune, and arrangements from George Gershwin's Porgy and Bess and his Rhapsody in Blue. Among the encores was their adaption of the finale from The Carnival of the Animals, to be repeated on many occasions in the hall as the favourite of Tatiana von Metternich.

In 1992, a scholarship in their name, the Paratore Brothers Scholarship Fund, was established at Boston University for highly gifted music students.

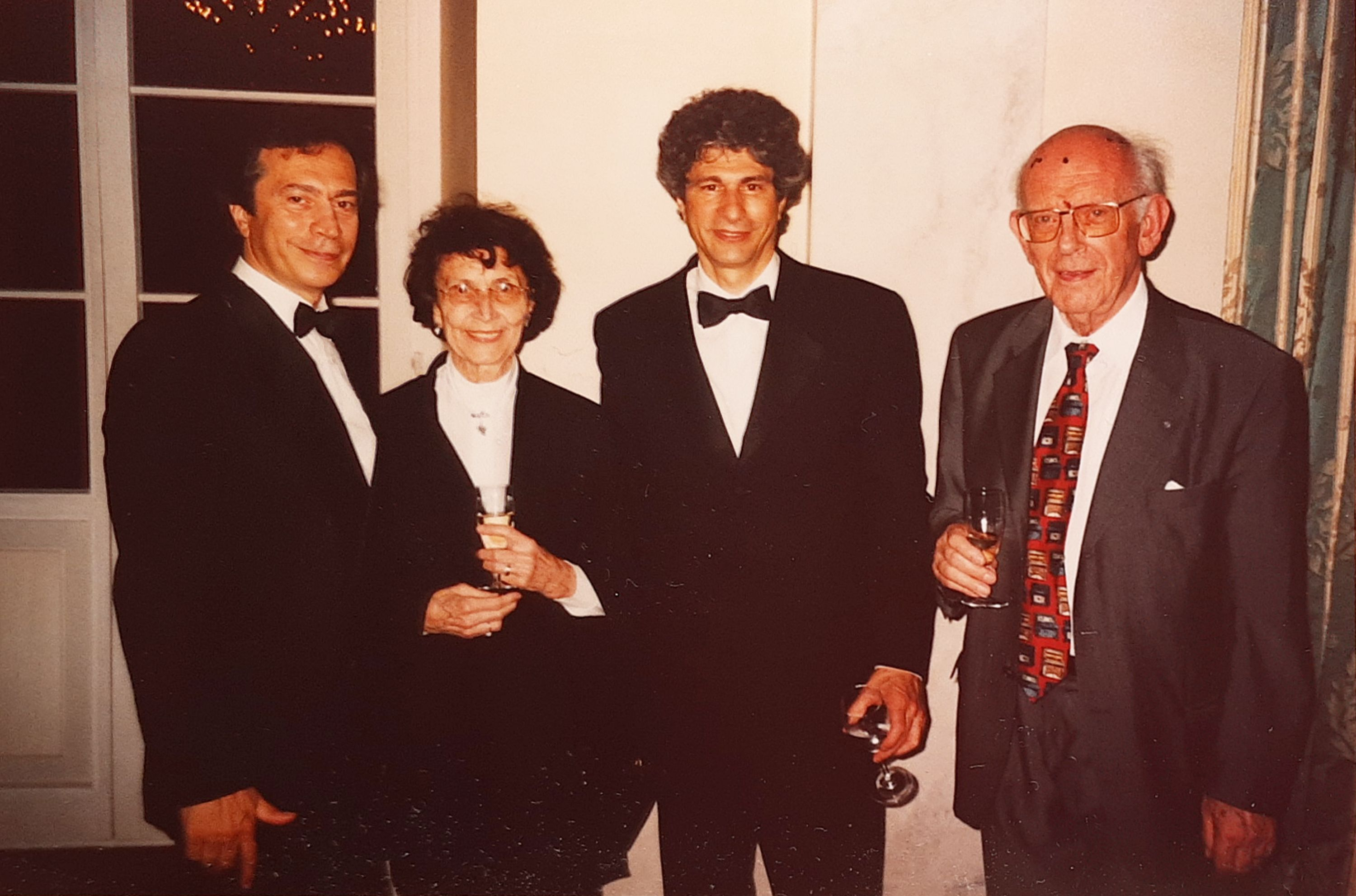
(left to right) Anthony Paratore, Ursula Jung, Joseph Paratore and Hans Otto Jung, 2001

The duo returned to the Rheingau Musik festival almost every year, in 2001 with a program of mainly pieces which composers arranged for two pianos, Stravinsky's The Rite of Spring, Ravel's Rapsodie espagnole and Debussy's Prélude à l'après-midi d'un faune, concluding with Darius Milhaud's Scaramouche. They recorded works by their friend Dave Brubeck in 2001, the ballet suite Points on Jazz and Four By Four, originally called Centennial Suite, when it was composed in 1949/50. A concert in 2004 juxtaposed works by Brubeck with music by Johann Sebastian Bach, recorded live. With the Bach Collegium Munich, conducted by Russell Gloyd, they played Bach's Concerto, BWV 1060, and Brubeck's Points on Jazz in a version with orchestra. For the second half of the concert the Dave Brubeck Quartet joined for works such as Brandenburg Gate, alluding to the Brandenburg Concertos.

In 2012, they were among the Wegbegleiter (Companions along the way) of the Rheingau Musik Festival in its 25th anniversary season, artists who had appeared regularly from the beginning. They performed in the Kurhaus Wiesbaden in a Kindersinfoniekonzert (symphony concert for children) Ravel's Ma mère l'oye and Der Karneval der Tiere by Camille Saint-Saëns, with the Dresdner Kapellsolisten and Rufus Beck narrating the text by Loriot.

They appeared on the NBC shows Today Show and The Tonight Show, and they were featured on a PBS show The Paratores: Two Brothers, Four Hands.

== Music commissioned and dedicated ==
Richard St. Clair composed his Double Concerto for Two Pianos and Concert Band for the Paratore Brothers, who gave the work its world premiere with the MIT Concert Band in May 1974, John Corley conducting. Manfred Trojahn composed on their commission in 1982 La folia / Musik für zwei Klaviere, premiered at the 32nd Berliner Festwochen on 16 September 1982. Wolfgang Rihm composed for them in 1985 Maske (Mask) for two pianos, premiered in Badenweiler on 8 March 1986. Michael Schelle composed his Concerto for Two Pianos and Orchestra for the Paratores in 1986 on commission from three orchestras; the premiere was by the Indianapolis Symphony Orchestra in January 1987. On their commission, William Bolcom wrote his Sonata for Two Pianos that they premiered in 1994. Dave Brubeck dedicated to them his "Points on Jazz", and entrusted his original two-piano music to them.

== Reviews ==
Bryan Miller wrote in the Chicago Tribune in 1994: "... they are remarkably well-matched and technically dazzling in their tandem playing". Makiko Yamashita observed in a concert in Sacramento in 2010: "Joseph with long and curly hair often played in an expressive and explosive style. Anthony was more reserved with a refined and controlled presence, gave a serious yet thoughtful and gentle performance."

== Awards ==
- 1974: ARD International Music Competition, first prize
