= Deborah Cook (soprano) =

American operatic singer (1938–2019)

Deborah Cook (July 6, 1938 – April 22, 2019) was an American operatic soprano who had a prolific international opera career during the 1970s and 1980s. Her career was primarily focused in Germany where she lived from 1972 through 1985. However, she did travel extensively throughout Europe and in the United States, performing in operas, concerts, recitals, and recording for radio productions. A gifted coloratura soprano, Cook sang a wide repertoire that encompassed English, German, French, and Italian opera from a variety of musical periods. She notably sang in a number of world premieres including Hans Werner Henze's We Come to the River at the Royal Opera, London in 1976.

== Life and work ==
Cook was born in Philadelphia, where she studied singing privately with Irene Williams, soprano. She sang in a number of student opera productions at Temple University during the early 1960s, beginning with the role of Adele in Die Fledermaus in 1963. She married Philadelphia psychiatrist, Robert L. Kashoff, who died December 29, 1964, shortly after the couple had married. Cook made her professional opera debut on October 31, 1965, at the Academy of Music with the Philadelphia Lyric Opera Company singing the title role in a concert version of Donizetti's Lucia di Lammermoor with Frank Guarrera as Enrico. However, this performance did not excite the attention that Cook was hoping for and she was forced to take work outside of music for the next several years while continuing with further studies with Williams, and Nicola Palumbo in New York City. She appeared in many concerts and performances in the Philadelphia area during the late 1960s including portraying Galatea in Handel's Acis and Galatea with John Darrenkamp as Damon at the Philadelphia Museum of Art in 1967 and returning there in 1968 to sing Vespina in Haydn's L'infedeltà delusa, both with the Concerto Soloists Chamber Orchestra of Philadelphia.

It wasn't until the early 1970s when Cook won a prize in an important singing competition in Chicago, that she drew the attention of the opera world. She made her international opera debut in 1971 singing Zerbinetta in Richard Strauss's Ariadne auf Naxos touring with the Glyndebourne Festival Opera. In 1972 she joined the roster at the Theater Bremen as one of their principal sopranos, where she remained until 1975 and continued to perform as a guest until 1980. She appeared there and in other German opera houses in roles such as Adina in Donizetti's L'elisir d'amore, Constanze in Mozart's Die Entführung aus dem Serail, Despina in his Così fan tutte, the title role in Donizetti's Lucia di Lammermoor, Olympia in Offenbach's Les contes d'Hoffmann, Philine in Mignon by Ambroise Thomas, the Queen in Die Verurteilung des Lukullus, the Queen of the Night in Mozart's Die Zauberflöte, and Zerbinetta.

In 1976 Cook made her debut with the Royal Opera at Covent Garden as Gilda in Verdi's Rigoletto, and that same year returned to that house to appear as Rachel in the world premiere of Henze's We Come to the River. She also was the Fiakermilli in a new production of Arabella by Richard Strauss, with Kiri te Kanawa in the title role. In 1978 she became a member of the Bavarian State Opera where she sang regularly through 1981, when she moved to the Hamburg State Opera. She was a frequent performer with the Oper Frankfurt. During this time she added to her repertoire such roles as Catherine in L'étoile du nord, Giulietta in Bellini's I Capuleti e i Montecchi and Leila in Bizet's Les pêcheurs de perles.

Cook continued to remain active in opera houses throughout Germany until 1985 when she moved back to the United States after marrying pianist Ronald Marlowe. During the thirteen years that she was in Germany she was highly active as a guest artist, making guest appearances with the Deutsche Oper am Rhein, the Deutsche Oper Berlin, the Bavarian State Opera, the Staatstheater am Gärtnerplatz in Munich, and with opera houses in Augsberg, Bern, Geneva, Hanover, Kassel, Leipzig, Nuremberg, and Stuttgart. In 1982 she sang the role of Angel of Bright Future in the world premiere of George Rochberg's The Confidence Man at the Santa Fe Opera. She also notably sang the role of The Soprano in the world premiere of Anton Ruppert's ...die Siebte at the Bayerische Staatsoper in Munich, Germany, and portrayed Tania in Luigi Nono's Al gran sole carico d'amore at the Frankfurt Opera.

Cook's other international opera credits during the 1970s and 1980s include performances with the Berlin State Opera, the Grand Théâtre de Genève, and the Teatro dell'Opera di Roma among others. She also had an active concert career during these years, appearing with such orchestras as the Philadelphia Orchestra, the San Francisco Symphony, the BBC Symphony Orchestra, the Orchestre de Paris, the Hong Kong Philharmonic, the Dresden Philharmonic, and with the Australian Broadcasting Orchestra in concerts in Sydney, Melbourne, Adelaide, Hobart and Launceston. She also portrayed Giulietta in I Capuleti e i Montecchi with the Gewandhaus Orchester. Cook has sung under many renowned conductors during her career, including Pierre Boulez, Michael Tilson Thomas, David Atherton, Nello Santi, Gianluigi Gelmetti, Michael Gielen, Wolfgang Sawallisch, Sir Georg Solti, Charles Mackerras, Sir Charles Groves, Hans Vonk, and Jesús López-Cobos and others.

After returning the United States in 1984, Cook's focus switched primarily away from performing to teaching. She taught voice at Haverford College, Bryn Mawr College and at Westtown School, as well as teaching masterclasses in Germany. She has sung as a Cantor in several synagogues in Philadelphia, and Maine. Beginning in October 2004, Cook sang frequently in concert at the University of Maine in Orono. One of these concerts featured Cook singing the world premiere of a work by Paul Ben-Haim. She traveled to Leipzig, Germany, in November 2005 to hold master classes in lieder. The soprano resided with her husband in Liberty, Maine, where she taught privately and concertized. A lieder concert was held in Waterville, Maine, where she sang repertoire by Scarlatti, Giordani, Bizet, Brahms, R.Strauss, among others. She died on April 22, 2019.

== Recordings ==
Deborah Cook has recorded the title role in Meyerbeer's Dinorah with the Philharmonia Orchestra, Opera Rara, London; the role of Prascovia in Meyerbeer's L'étoile du nord, Opera Rara, London; and the role of the Naiad in Strauss' Ariadne auf Naxos with conductor Sir Georg Solti and the London Symphony Orchestra.
