= James Gibb (pianist) =

British pianist and teacher (1918-2013)

James Gibb (7 March 1918 – 16 June 2013) was an English pianist and teacher. He performed regularly as a solo recitalist, concerto pianist and chamber music player for over four decades, and appeared in many radio broadcasts.

== Early life ==
Born in Monkseaton, Tyneside, to a wealthy family, Gibb was one of three children. His older sister was also a pianist. He went to school in Edinburgh, receiving his first piano lessons from George Ramsay Geikie. He later studied piano with Mabel Lander, herself a pupil of Theodor Leschetizky.

== Career ==
In London before the war Gibb became associated with the socialist community attached to the Unity Theatre in King's Cross, including the actor Alfie Bass, poet Randall Swingler and piano duo Mary and Geraldine Peppin. He marched against Oswald Mosley's Fascists in 1938. Friendships were formed with composers including Constant Lambert, Alan Rawsthorne and Bernard Stevens, whose music he later performed and recorded. During the war Gibb served as a radio operator with the Royal Artillery, latterly based in Hamburg, and performed concerts for the troops.

Gibb made his debut at the Proms in 1949 (playing Dohnányi's Variations on a Nursery Song) and became a regular performer at the festival over the next decade. In 1949 he also made his international debut, playing Prokofiev's Third Piano Concerto in Hamburg with the North-West German Radio Orchestra. Gibb championed the works of British composers, but Scarlatti, Haydn, Beethoven and Schubert were also an important part of his repertoire. In 1951 Gibb was one of the two pianists that accompanied the UK premiere of Marc Blitzstein's musical The Cradle Will Rock at the Unity Theatre. He also gave the British premiere of Balakirev's Second Piano Concerto.

Gibb began teaching at the Guildhall School of Music from the 1960s, becoming head of keyboard studies there in 1967 and sometimes performing piano four hands with his colleague Edith Vogel. His pupils included Andreas Boyde, Alissa Firsova, Ivana Gavrić, John Tilbury and Debbie Wiseman. He retired in 2002.

== Death ==
Gibb lived in a flat at 10, Regent's Park Road, NW1 from 1956 until his death in 2013, aged 95. He suffered from dementia in his final years.
