= Erika Fox =

British composer and teacher

Erika Fox (born 3 October 1936) is a British composer and teacher. Born in Vienna (as Erika Roth), she grew up in an Orthodox Jewish home: her mother, Dina Roth Hager, had shown early promise as an artist.. In 1939 at the age of three, Fox emigrated to England as a refugee. There she went on to study composition with Bernard Stevens and piano with Angus Morrison at the Royal College of Music, also taking private composition lessons with Jeremy Dale Roberts and Harrison Birtwistle. She married Manfred Fox in 1961. He died in 2006.

Fox was active in modern music circles from the 1970s, working with the Fires of London, the Nash Ensemble, Dartington and the Society for the Promotion of New Music. For two decades she enjoyed considerable success, with works such the Kaleidoscope quartet (for flute, harp, vibraphone and cello, 1983) and her puppet music drama The Bet (1990), which was performed at the Purcell Room, the Almeida Theatre, the Huddersfield Festival and the Norwich Puppet Theatre. But her music faded from view in the mid-1990s.

A revival of interest resulted in the issue of a CD recording in 2019, the first recordings of her music. Her orchestral work Osen Shomaat was recorded by the BBC Symphony Orchestra in 2020. David Spielt Vor Saul a new concerto for piano and large ensemble, was commissioned by the BBC and first performed by Julian Jacobson and the BBC Scottish Symphony Orchestra, conducted by Geoffrey Paterson, at City Halls, Glasgow, on 13 January 2022.

Her musical style shows the influence of Eastern European folk music combined with ancient modal liturgical chant and Jewish Chassidic music. She has taught as the Centre for Young Musicians in Pimlico, at the Guildhall School of Music and Drama, and as Visiting Composer and Teacher at the University of Auckland, New Zealand. She lives in West London.

== Works ==
Fox writes for stage and vocal as well as instrumental performance, and her compositions incorporate elements of Jewish traditional music. Selected works include:

- Nine lessons from Isaiah (1970)
- Lamentations for Four (1973)
- The Slaughterer (1975), chamber opera
- Paths Where the Mourners Tread (1980), chamber ensemble
- Litany (1981), for strings
- Kaleidoscope (1983), quartet
- Movement (1983), for string sextet
- Quasi una Cadenza (1983)
- Shir (1983) for large chamber ensemble
- Nick's Lament (1984)
- Osen Shoomaat (1985) for 36 solo strings
- Rivka's Fiddle (1986)
- On Visiting Stravinsky's Grave at San Michele (1988), piano
- Hungarian Rhapsody (1989)
- The Bet (1990) puppet music drama, text by Elaine Feinstein
- The Dancer, Hotoke (1991) chamber opera, text by Ruth Fainlight, commissioned by Garden Venture
- The Moon of Moses (1992) for solo cello
- Singender Steige (1994)
- Tuned Spheres (1995)
- Davidsbündler Lieder (1999), for flute and piano
- Remembering the Tango (1999)
- Sonnet (2000)
- Malinconia Militare (2003) for chamber ensemble
- Café, Warsaw 1944 (2005) for chamber ensemble
- Several Fanfares (2020) for solo trumpet
- Lament 2020 (2020) for contrabass flute and piano
- David Spielt Vor Saul (2021) (after Rilke) for piano and ensemble
