= Piano duet =

Musical work for two pianists

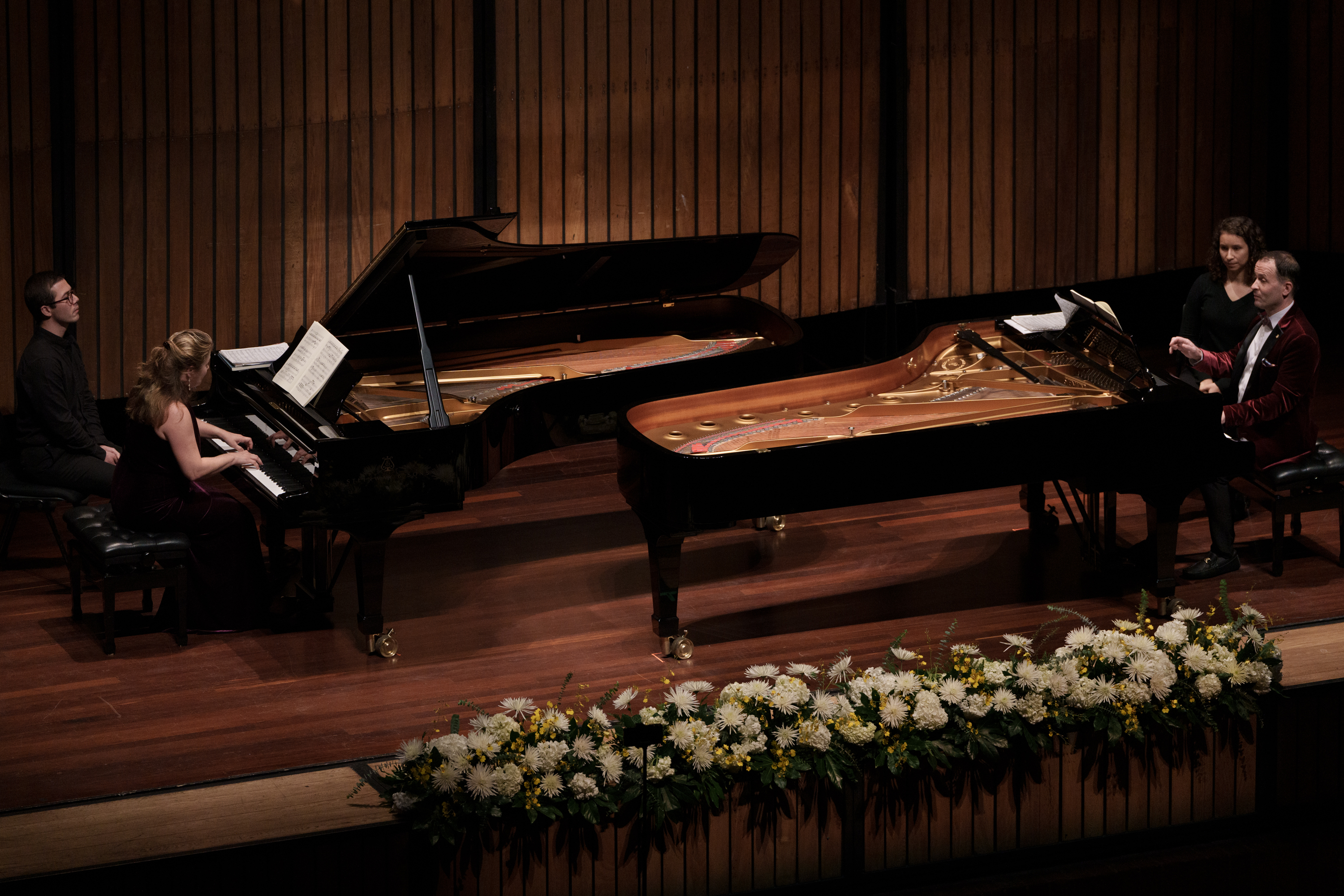
The Latsos Piano Duo in Teatro Metropolitano

According to the Grove Dictionary of Music and Musicians, there are two kinds of piano duet: "[pieces of music] for two players at one instrument, and those in which each of the two pianists has an instrument to themselves." In American English usage, the former is often referred to as a "piece for four hands", or "piano four hands". The one-piano duet has a larger repertory, and it can be difficult to keep two pianos in tune with each other. However, Grove notes that the one-piano duet has come to be regarded as a modest, domestic form of music-making by comparison with "the more glamorous two-piano duet". The two-piano form is also referred to as a piano duo, although this term also refers to a set of two piano players who play together regularly (thus, duos play duets).

Piano duet repertory consists of both music originally composed for piano duets and music arranged for piano duets.

One of the first keyboard duets is "For two Virginals" by Giles Farnaby from the Fitzwilliam Virginal Book, written in the late 16th century. The piano duet came to popularity in the second half of the 18th century.

== See also ==
- List of compositions for piano duo
- List of classical piano duos (performers)
