= We Come to the River =

Opera by Hans Werner Henze

We Come to the River – Wir erreichen den Fluss
- Opera by Hans Werner Henze
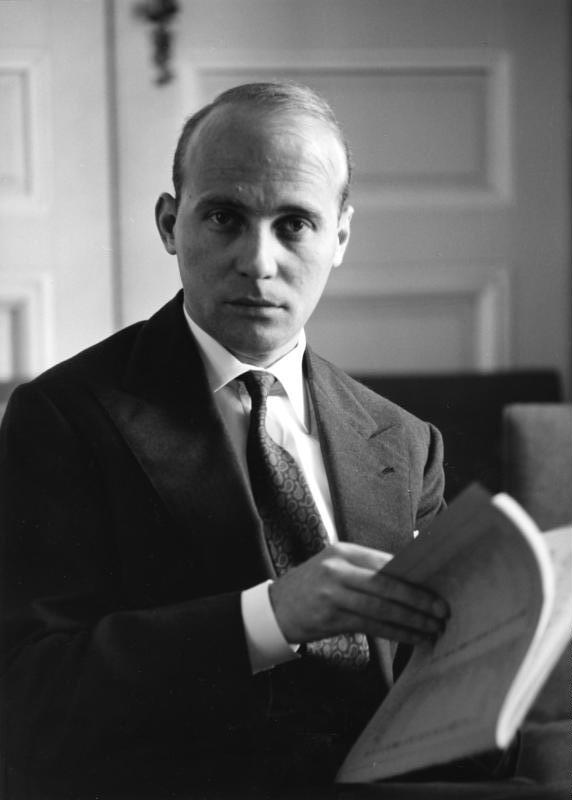
- The composer in 1960
- Description: Actions for music
- Librettist: Edward Bond
- Premiere: 12 July 1976; Royal Opera House Covent Garden

We Come to the River – Wir erreichen den Fluss is an opera by Hans Werner Henze to an English-language libretto by Edward Bond. Henze and Bond described this work as "Actions for music", rather than an opera. It was Henze's 7th opera, originally written for The Royal Opera in London, and takes as its focus the horrors of war. The opera was first performed at the Royal Opera House, Covent Garden, London on 12 July 1976, with the composer as producer, Jürgen Henze as director, and David Atherton conducting. It was subsequently staged at the Deutsche Oper Berlin, and received its first American performance at Santa Fe Opera in 1984, conducted by Dennis Russell Davies.

The opera is notable for its complex staging, including a large cast of 111 roles covered by over 50 singers, with doubling of roles and three separate instrumental ensembles, including a percussionist who actually performs among the singers on stage. The scholar Robert Hatten has noted the mix of musical styles that Henze has employed, ranging from 'atonal to neoclassically tonal'. Although the subject matter of war would usually indicate a realistic treatment, Henze calls for three separate stages, and urges producers to avoid realism in the costuming. The Emperor's role is written for a mezzo-soprano voice – thus the abstract Emperor becomes the embodiment of evil. The use of typically romantic coloraturas for the role of Rachel is another device to remove a character from realism into abstraction – in this case, the sycophantic nature of Rachel. Despite the vast forces required to perform the work, Henze asks for the utmost simplicity in production values.

== Performance history ==
Following its premiere at the Royal Opera House, Covent Garden, in 1976, and later that same year in the Deutsche Oper Berlin, the opera was given in 1977 at the Cologne Opera and the Staatsoper Stuttgart. After some years, it was presented by The Santa Fe Opera in 1984, staged by Alfred Kirchner, by the Hamburg State Opera in 2001, and by Semperoper in Dresden in 2012.

== Roles ==
Role	Voice type	Premiere cast, 12 July 1976 (Conductor: David Atherton) London Sinfonietta and Royal Opera House orchestra
Young woman	soprano	Josephine Barstow
Second soldier's wife	soprano	Felicity Lott
Rachel	soprano	Deborah Cook
May	soprano	Valerie Masterson
Emperor	mezzo-soprano	Josephine Veasey
General	baritone	Norman Welsby
First soldier	tenor	Francis Egerton
Second soldier	tenor	Gerald English
Third soldier	tenor	Alan Watt
Fourth soldier	tenor	Malcolm King
Fifth soldier	tenor	Alexander Oliver
Sixth soldier	tenor	John Lanigan
Seventh soldier	bass	Richard Angas
Eighth soldier	bass	Dennis Wicks
Old woman	mezzo-soprano	Yvonne Kenny
Deserter	tenor	Robert Tear
NCO	baritone	Bryan Drake
Governor	baritone	Raimund Herincx
Doctor	bass	Michael Langdon
Aide	bass	Paul Hudson
Major Hillcourt	mime	Kenton Moore
Gentleman / Victim	tenor	Arthur Davies

== Synopsis ==
The work is in two acts, divided into 11 scenes. The setting is an imaginary empire.

=== Act 1 ===
The general, who gives no thought to the morality of his profession, has put down an abortive revolution. A deserter is executed, after the general has heard his pleading. Later, the soldier's wife and her mother, who have been looting corpses to try to survive, are also shot. Later, the doctor tells the general that he has a disease that will eventually render him blind. This news causes the general to start to come to terms with his own vulnerability, and to start to question war. Finally repulsed by images of the battlefield wounded, the general leaves the army, but this does not obliterate his past actions.

=== Act 2 ===
The general has been imprisoned in an insane asylum. The asylum inhabitants obsessively tell tales of violence while tearing at their hair and clothes. They also prepare an imaginary boat for a future escape. One of the general's soldiers tells him of the atrocities going on. The authorities approach the general again to order him to take the field on behalf of the empire. When he refuses, the emperor's henchmen blind him so that he cannot lead a revolution from the asylum. The blind general sees visions of his victims. At the close of the work, the inmates kill the general.
