= Rawicz and Landauer =

Piano duo

- Genres: Space age pop; Musical; Easy listening; Classical music
- Instrument: Pianos
- Years active: 1932 – 1970
- Labels: Decca; London; Parrot; Columbia; WBR; Durium UK
- Members: Marjan Rawicz; Walter Landauer

Rawicz and Landauer were a popular piano duo team who performed from 1932 to 1970. They were initially based in Vienna, Austria, but moved to the United Kingdom in the early part of their career. The duo were known for their arrangements of popular classics.

== Biography ==
Marjan (or Maryan) Rawicz (1898 – 30 January 1970) was Polish. He studied in Poland, and in Vienna under Richard Robert, and also studied law at the University of Kraków, playing the piano at seaside resorts in his holidays to make ends meet.

Walter Landauer (4 September 1910 – 4 August 1983) was born in Vienna. He studied at the Vienna Music Academy and under Emil von Sauer.

== Career ==
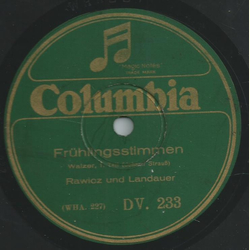
Johann Strauss Frühlingsstimmen Columbia 233

Rawicz and Landauer met by chance at a resort in 1930 or 1931, when Landauer heard Rawicz whistling a tune he liked, and asked him what it was and how to play it on the piano. It proved to be a polka by Bedřich Smetana. They soon discovered a mutual interest, and their duo was born.

By 1932 Rawicz and Landauer had broadcast on Austrian radio, and in 1933 they had a concert tour throughout Europe. They escaped Nazi Europe in 1935 and moved to the United Kingdom with their wives, becoming favourites of the Prince of Wales (later King Edward VIII). During World War II, like many people originally from mainland Europe, they found themselves considered potential enemies and were interned on the Isle of Man, Rawicz in Hutchinson Camp. After release, they both became British subjects. Richard Tauber, with whom they had performed in Vienna in the 1930s, invited them to join him on concert tours throughout the UK and as guests on his radio show. They appeared in Tauber's Memorial Concert at the Royal Albert Hall on 20 February 1948.

Until Rawicz's death in 1970 they carved out a formidable reputation as a two-piano team. They were legendary for the precision of their ensemble playing. They could start a piece together while seated in adjacent rooms; the door between them was then closed until near the end of the piece, when it was opened to find them still in time with one another. They transformed many popular classics into duets, sold tens of thousands of records and made regular BBC radio broadcasts. Their post-war tours included the United States, Europe, Australia, and South Africa. They had many collaborations with Mantovani, and recorded Saint-Saëns' The Carnival of the Animals under Sir John Barbirolli.

Their duo repertoire was characterised by such pieces as Richard Addinsell's Warsaw Concerto arranged for two pianos, and their own arrangements of the Waltz from Tchaikovsky's Eugene Onegin, Khachaturian's Sabre Dance and Waltz from Masquerade, Debussy's Clair de lune, Arabesque No. 1 and Golliwog's Cakewalk, and Strauss waltzes and polkas.

After Marjan Rawicz's death in 1970, Walter Landauer continued playing as a solo pianist, until his own death in 1983.

Landauer was also a composer, whose works include Vienna Concerto for piano and orchestra and short pieces such as Gamine, Summer Rain and Echo Waltz for piano solo.

Together, they wrote a number of derivative works for two pianos:

- Austro-Hungary (after Liszt)
- Liszt in Rhythm (after Liszt)
- Chopinezza (after Chopin)
- Carmen Variations (after Bizet)
- Fledermaus Fantasy (after Johann Strauss II)
- Favourite Waltzes (after Baynes, Franz Lehár, Udall and Noël Coward).

They appeared in the film Home Sweet Home (1945 film) as themselves.

They were the subjects of This Is Your Life in 1961 when they were surprised by Eamonn Andrews at the BBC Television Theatre.

== See also ==
- List of émigré musicians from Nazi Europe who settled in Britain
