= Marlowe Brothers =

- Origin: Philadelphia, Pennsylvania, United States
- Genres: Classical
- Past members: Jeffrey Marlowe; Ronald Marlowe

The Marlowe Brothers is the name under which the duo-pianists Jeffrey and Ronald Marlowe performed.

== Biography ==
The Marlowe brothers were born on July 28, 1939, in Westerly, Rhode Island, to George Marlowe, a violinist and orchestra leader, and Natalie Lindenbaum Marlowe, an interior designer and artist. They were born six weeks premature while their parents, who lived in Philadelphia, Pennsylvania, were on vacation. The brothers grew up in the West Oak Lane neighborhood of Philadelphia.

Jeffrey Marlowe became a musician at the age of four in Philadelphia. His identical twin, Ronald, also began playing very young, and the two soon matched each other in ability. Their parents paid for piano lessons, and they came under the wing of Eleanor Sokoloff, a teacher at the Curtis Institute of Music, and then were mentored by Pierre Luboshutz and Genia Nemenoff.

The Marlowe Brothers began to perform together and became nationally acclaimed. By age 11, they debuted with the Philadelphia Orchestra. Their adolescent resume included being on The Tonight Show Starring Johnny Carson, The Garry Moore Show, The Steve Allen Show, The Milton Berle Show and The Gene London Show. They also appeared on the panel show of “I’ve Got a Secret” on December 19, 1966.

Their musical selections ranged from classical to pop music. Some of the Marlowe Brothers' performances included music of Brahms, Mozart and Poulenc as well as some of their own renditions of Beatles’ melodies.

After college, the Marlowe brothers continued to tour, revising and perfecting their gig as identical twin music prodigies. They went on to be the featured pianists of the New York Philharmonic (like their teachers), the Pittsburgh Symphony and the Dallas Symphony Orchestra. They played together professionally well into their 50s.

In later years both Ronald and Jeffrey Marlowe gave piano lessons to young performers in Maine and Pennsylvania respectively.

Since 1985 Ronald has been married to soprano Deborah Cook.

Jeffrey was married in 1965 to Judy Newman. They had two daughters. He died July 24, 2021, of complications from lymphoma at his home in Blue Bell, Pennsylvania.
