= Alexander and Daykin =

American piano duo

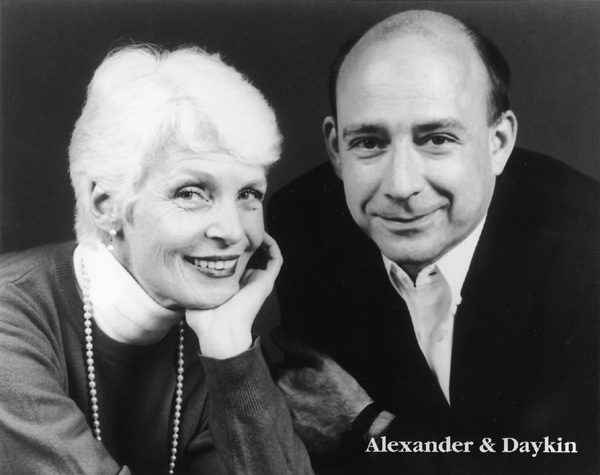

Millette Alexander and Frank Daykin, known as Alexander and Daykin, were an American piano duo performing various pieces for piano four-hands and two pianos. Their activity as a performing duo ended in December 2016.

The two pianists met at the Juilliard School in 1979, and quickly formed a professional duo dedicated to the large body of original works for piano four-hands from Tomkins to the 20th century. A fortuitous rediscovery of an early 20th-century two-piano transcription of Johann Sebastian Bach's The Art of Fugue became one of their principal artistic expressions as well, performed in Paris's Salle Gaveau in 1986, and recorded on Connoisseur Society in 1994. They are one of the first duos to record this arrangement, which won one of the "Best New Recordings" in the January 1996 issue of American Record Guide.

The duo made their Carnegie Recital Hall (Weill Recital Hall) debut in 1994, with "encore" 20th anniversary recitals in the 1999/2000 season. Their orchestral debut was in 1985, with the Northwest Michigan Symphony, in Camille Saint-Saëns' The Carnival of the Animals. The duo made a second commercial recording "Paris Originals" for Connoisseur Society in 1997.

Millette Alexander preceded her piano career with a notable career as an actress, primarily in daytime television, including sixteen years on "Guiding Light" (1967–1983), and others previous to that. Mr. Daykin is the author of The Encyclopedia of French Art Song: Fauré, Debussy, Ravel, Poulenc (2013, Pendragon Press), as well as five volumes of poetry.
