= Thomas Hecht =

Thomas Hecht (born October 31, 1960, in Baltimore, Maryland) is an American pianist, composer and professor of piano, based at the Yong Siew Toh Conservatory of Music, National University of Singapore where he was appointed founding head of piano studies in 2003.
