= Duo: Stephanie Ho and Saar Ahuvia =

Stephanie Ho and Saar Ahuvia, concert pianists, collaborate to perform four hand works as "Duo." Ho attended Oberlin College receiving degrees in religion and piano performance. Both Ho and Ahuvia pursued graduate degrees in performance at the Peabody Institute of Johns Hopkins University and studied with Leon Fleisher.

Their performance repertoire is diverse. Their groundbreaking performance of Igor Stravinsky's The Rite of Spring arranged for four hands was reviewed by The New York Times. They have also performed an arrangement of Stravinsky's Petrushka, the finale of which, The New York Times declared, "free of percussion ... came through in all [its] visionary clarity". Duo has issued several CDs, including "Bach Crossings," which was described by the Chicago Reader as a "lovely, concise recording [that] does nothing to obscure Bach's indelible melodies ... it still feels very different from conventional performances of the same music: Kurtág provides a modern sensibility and heightened harmonic splendor, while Ho and Ahuvia bring a less rigid sense of time and rhythm, creating a rich fluidity". Their CD "Beethoven Dialogues" includes Beethoven's String Quartet No. 6 in G Major. A review of a live performance of it by Stephanie and Saar said that it "captured the music's serenity, the melodic interplay exquisitely realized".
