= Bernard Stevens =

British composer

Bernard (George) Stevens (2 March 1916 – 6 January 1983) was a British composer who first became known to the wider public when he won a newspaper composition prize for a 'Victory Symphony' post-war in 1946. The broader success was not sustained, but Stevens went on to become a respected composer and teacher at the Royal College of Music, using traditional forms for his compositions while extending his essentially tonal harmonic language towards serialism.

== Early career ==
Born in Stamford Hill, London, Stevens grew up in Essex, and received his first musical education at Southend High School, where his teacher was Arthur Hutchings. He began piano lessons at the age of eight. The pianist and Bach specialist Harold Samuel heard him play and offered encouragement. He went on to study English and Music at St John's College, Cambridge, with E. J. Dent and Cyril Rootham, then at the Royal College of Music with R. O. Morris (composition) and Gordon Jacob (orchestration) from 1937 to 1940. At the college, Arthur Benjamin taught him piano and Constant Lambert conducting.

Called up for war service in 1940, he was rejected for a combat role due to his poor eyesight, so he served in the Royal Army Pay Corps. While there, he composed his Piano Trio and his Violin Sonata, Op. 1, written for his wife Bertha, a violin teacher whom he married in 1941. The sonata attracted the attention of Max Rostal, who commissioned a Violin Concerto, which Stevens also wrote during his army service. In 1946 his First Symphony, entitled Symphony of Liberation, won first prize in a competition sponsored by the Daily Express newspaper for a 'Victory Symphony' to celebrate the end of the war with a high-profile premiere at the Royal Albert Hall. The competition judges were Arthur Bliss, Constant Lambert and Malcolm Sargent. The symphony was dedicated to the memory of his friend, the artist and poet Clive Branson, who was killed in action in 1944.

The success of the symphony led to some lucrative work scoring films in the late 1940s, but after completing three scores, Stevens decided not to continue writing film music. In 1948, he was appointed Professor of Composition at the Royal College of Music, a post he combined from 1967 with a professorship at the University of London. As an examiner he travelled widely, especially in Eastern Europe. His students included Keith Burstein, Stephen Dodgson, Michael Finnissy, Erika Fox, Malcolm Lipkin, Carlo Martelli and John White.

== Politics ==
Stevens was intellectually and emotionally committed to the left and associated with other socialist artists and writers, such as his friends Alan Bush, Mary and Geraldine Peppin, Randall Swingler and Montagu Slater, and was active in the Workers' Music Association. In 1955, a contentious slander case served by Edward Clark on Benjamin Frankel (involving an accusation that Frankel had embezzled ISCM funds) involved Bernard Stevens and Christian Darnton as witnesses. Frankel accused them of lying at the behest of the Communist Party. This had a devastating effect on Stevens. He resigned his Party membership a year later, also as a protest against the Soviet suppression of the 1956 Hungarian uprising. He nevertheless remained committed to Marxist principles.

== Later life ==
Stevens lived at 71 Parkhill Road, Belsize Park after the war, a house he bought from Max Rostal. Seeking a more peaceful environment where he could compose, he moved in 1951 to a village in Essex, where his address was The Forge, Great Maplestead. His music room was in a converted blacksmith's forge next to the house. In the late 1960s, he and Bertha acquired a small plot of land near Mahón on the island of Menorca and built a holiday villa there, where they spent many summers over the following decade. His final work, the Concertante for Two Pianos (written for Isobel Beyer and Harvey Dagul), was composed at the villa. Stevens died in January 1983 after being diagnosed with cancer six years earlier. He was survived by his wife Bertha and daughter Catherine Stevens (born 1952), a viola player.

== Music ==
Influenced by composers such as Ernest Bloch, Ferruccio Busoni, Shostakovich, Alan Bush and Edmund Rubbra, Stevens also used fantasia-like elements of form which he took from the Elizabethans Dowland and Farnaby. He frequently composed tightly compressed works, such as the Opus 1 Violin Sonata and the later Piano Sonata, incorporating three individual movements within a single, uninterrupted span. The Symphony No.1 (1945), a cry of "Liberation" after Nazism, could seem gestural with its looser structure and programmatic elements, and is not typical. Even so, it "completely avoids the rhetoric and pomp of many other 'Victory' pieces". His Fugal Overture received its premiere at the BBC Proms in 1948, conducted by Malcolm Sargent.

The more inward-looking pieces that followed use an essentially diatonic but increasingly individual harmonic language. An example is the 1952 Cello Concerto written for William Pleeth, with its dark and expressive central Chaconne. The later works attracted less public attention, but were highly regarded by musicians. Stevens began to explore a very personal application of 12-note serialism. This is best illustrated in three key works: the String Quartet No 2 (1962), the Symphony No 2 (1964) and the Variations for Orchestra (1964). In these works, everything that follows is derived from the opening materials, and (as Malcolm MacDonald has pointed out) the 12-note series employed is used in the context of tonalism "to supply triads, scalic segments, leading notes and other elements of tonal vocabulary". Of the String Quartet No 2, Macdonald says:

The Second Quartet's language is neither neo-Expressionist or serialist; rather, it uses Schoenberg's fierce logic to create the impression of a seamlessly unfolding tonal song that, creating its own haunting, individual sound world, draws the listener in with its emotional power.

Towards the end of his life, Stevens explored new methods of tonal organization involving correspondence with the I Ching - evident in his final piece of chamber music, Autumn Sequence (1980) for guitar and harpsichord. In recent years most of his major orchestral, chamber and piano works have been recorded.

== List of works ==
=== Orchestral ===
- Violin Concerto, Op. 4 (1943)
- Ricercar, Op. 6, for string orchestra (1944)
- A Symphony of Liberation, Op. 7 (1945)
- Eclogue, Op. 8, for small orchestra (1946)
- Fugal Overture, Op. 9, for orchestra (1947)
- Sinfonietta, Op. 10, for string orchestra (1948) (dedicated to Norman Fulton)
- Overture East and West, Op. 16, for wind orchestra (1950)
- Cello Concerto, Op. 18 (1952)
- Piano Concerto, Op. 26 (1955, rev. 1981)
- Dance Suite, Op. 28, for orchestra (1957)
- Adagio and Fugue, Op. 31a, for wind orchestra (1959)
- Prelude and Fugue, Op. 31b, for orchestra (1960)
- Symphony No. 2, Op. 35 (1964)
- Variations, Op. 36, for orchestra (1964)
- Choriamb, Op. 41 (1968)
- Introduction, Variations and Fugue on a theme of Giles Farnaby, Op. 47, for orchestra (1972)

=== Opera ===
- Mimosa, Op. 15, unfinished opera in 3 acts to libretto by Montagu Slater (1950)
- The Shadow of the Glen, Op. 50, opera in 1 act to libretto by J. M. Synge (1978–79)

=== Choral and vocal ===
- Mass, for unaccompanied double choir (1938–39)
- The Harvest of Peace, Op. 19, cantata for speaker, soprano, baritone, mixed choir and string orchestra to text by Randall Swingler (1952)
- The Palatine Coast: Three Folkish Songs, Op. 21, for high voice and piano (1952)
- The Pilgrims of Hope, Op. 27, cantata for soprano, baritone, mixed choir and orchestra to text by William Morris (1956, rev. 1968)
- Two Poetical Sketches, Op. 32, for female voices and strings to text by William Blake (1961)
- Thanksgiving, Op. 37, motet for mixed choir and string orchestra (or organ) to text by Rabindranath Tagore (1965)
- Et Resurrexit, Op. 43, cantata for alto, tenor, mixed choir and orchestra to texts from Ecclesiastes and Randall Swingler (1969)
- Hymn to Light, Op. 44, anthem for mixed choir, organ, brass and percussion to text by Rabindranath Tagore (1970)
- The Turning World, Op. 46, motet for baritone, mixed choir, orchestra and piano to text by Randall Swingler (1971)
- The True Dark, Op. 49, song cycle for baritione and piano to text by Randall Swingler (1974)

=== Chamber and instrumental ===
- Violin Sonata, Op. 1 (1940)
- Theme and variations for piano, Op. 2 (1941)
- Piano Trio, Op. 3 (1942)
- Theme and Variations, Op. 11, for string quartet (1949) (implicitly String Quartet No. 1)
- Two Fanfares, Op. 12, for four natural trumpets (1949)
- Fantasia on The Irish Ho-Hoane, Op. 13, for piano duet (1949)
- Five Inventions for piano, Op. 14 (written for James Gibb)
- Ballad No 1, Op. 17 for solo piano
- Fantasia on a Theme of Dowland, Op. 23, for violin and piano (1953)
- Two Improvisations on Folk Songs, Op. 24, for brass quintet (1954)
- Piano Sonata in One Movement, Op. 25 (1954)
- Introduction and Allegro, Op. 29, for piano duet (1957)
- Lyric Suite, Op. 30, for string trio (1958)
- Two Dances, Op. 33, for piano duet (1962)
- String Quartet No. 2, Op. 34 (1962)
- Horn Trio, Op. 38 (1966)
- Fantasia for organ, Op. 39 (1966)
- Suite, Op. 40, for flute, oboe, violin, viola da gamba or viola, cello and harpsichord or piano (1967)
- Ballad No 2, Op. 42 for solo piano (1969, premiere Ronald Stevenson)
- Ballad (The Bramble Briar), Op.45 for guitar (1971)
- Fughetta for organ (1974)
- Autumn Sequence, Op. 52 for guitar and harpsichord (1980)
- Elegiac Fugue on the name Geraldine (1981) (in memory Geraldine Peppin)
- Concertante for two pianos, Op.55 (1982)

=== Film ===
- The Upturned Glass (1947) (concert orchestral sequence arranged by Adrian Williams)
- The Mark of Cain (1947) (concert orchestral sequence arranged by Adrian Williams)
- Once a Jolly Swagman (1948)
