= Janine Reding =

Belgian pianist and pedagogue

- Born: November 21, 1920
- Died: 31 December 2015 (aged 95)
- Genres: Classical
- Occupation: Pianist

Janine Reding (21 November 1920, Brussels – 31 December 2015, Monaco) was a Belgian pianist and pedagogue.

== Biography ==
Janine Reding was the daughter of Fernand Reding, lawyer and editor-in-chief of the Brussels daily newspaper L'Éventail, and Yvonne Guidé (1892-1932), daughter of the oboist and opera manager Guillaume Guidé. She grew up in Brussels’ privileged circles. Her mother Yvonne, was an accomplished & well-known musician, and as a child she heard a number of prominent pianists and composers playing on the Pleyel grand piano in the family salon in Rue Américaine.

Reding began to study piano at six, becoming at ten the youngest student of Arthur De Greef who usually only taught adults. When De Greef died in 1940, she continued her musical studies with Austrian conductor Erich Kleiber and German pianist Kurt Leimer.
Reding gave her first public recital at the age of 17 at Brussels Charlier Museum where, in spite of a blackout, she carried on performing to thunderous applause. In November 1939, she entered the newly created Queen Elisabeth Music Chapel where she studied harmony with René Moulaert, music history with Roger Bragard, acoustics with Monfort, philosophy with Philippe Devaux, art history with Paul Fierens, and counterpoint, fugue and composition with Jean Absil. While still studying, she met her future husband, pianist Henry Piette, also a student of the Music Chapel. The couple married on 6 March 1942.

== The Reding–Piette Piano Duo ==
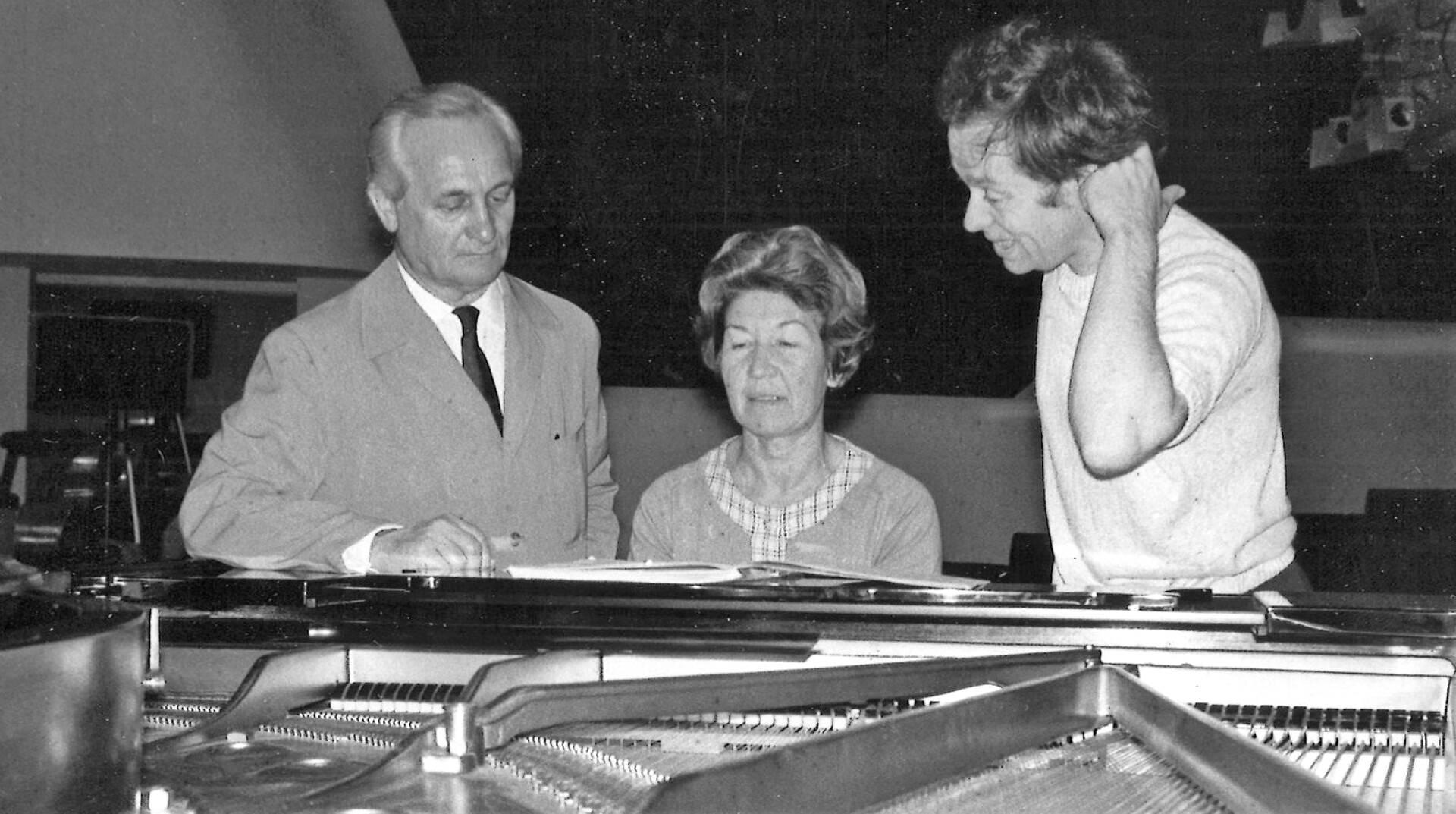
The Reding–Piette duo in 1972, visiting Finland. To the right, the conductor Jorma Panula.

Janine Reding and Henry Piette graduated in piano pedagogy in 1943. In May 1945, following advice from the conductor Leon Guller, the young couple devoted themselves to performing repertoire for two pianos. The duo’s early career was boosted thanks to support from Marcel Cuvelier, director of the Philharmonic Society in Brussels, and later from Ernest Ansermet, famous conductor at Radio Suisse Romande, and Émile Vuillermoz, influent French musical critic. During this period, the Duo played the first European performance of the Sonata for two pianos and percussion by Béla Bartók in both its chamber and orchestral versions.

== International career ==
Following these auspicious beginnings, the Reding-Piette Duo went on to perform much of the repertoire for two pianos. They also premiered a number of new works written especially for them. Important milestones in their career included the first Belgian performance of the Scottish Ballad by Benjamin Britten, the Sonata for two pianos by Igor Stravinsky, the 5th symphony, "In Ecco", from the Concerto for two pianos by Gian Francesco Malipiero, and the concertos for two pianos by Darius Milhaud and Francis Poulenc. The duo performed with important conductors including Eugène Jochum, Lorin Maazel, Dean Dixon, Mario Rossi, Hans Schmidt-Isserstedt, Eleazar de Carvalho, Charles Munch, André Cluytens, Rafael Kubelík, and Paul van Kempen.

Preferring the spontaneity of live performance, the Reding-Piette Duo refused to record, considering recordings “canned music”. However, after her husband’s death in 1987, Janine Reding changed her mind. English pianist Moura Lympany was put in charge of gathering different recording sessions that the duet had performed for various radio stations around the world. This compilation was edited by the English firm Olympia Compact Discs Ltd. Following the release of this anthology, Janine Reding was contacted to give master classes in a broad variety of musical institutions (Occidental College, UCLA, the Oberlin Conservatory of Music, the Peabody Institute, Charles University (Prague), and the Franz Liszt Academy of Music in Budapest. In December 1992, Janine was a visiting professor at the Deptartment of Music, Washington University where she gave three piano masterclasses. She later taught from her home in Monaco.

== Janine Reding-Piette Collection ==
The Janine-Reding-Piette Collection is composed of donations made between 1987 and 2015 and is housed at the Music Division of the Royal Library of Belgium. It includes documents relating to the musical careers of Reding-Piette Duo and of Guillaume Guidé, the autographs collection of Yvonne Guidé, numerous autograph and printed scores, pictures, and correspondence.

== Repertoire ==
Composer	Two pianos with orchestra	Two pianos
Jean Absil		Rhapsodie no.5 op. 102 (1959), for 2 pianos
Jehan Alain		Litanies (JA119a) for two pianos, transcribed by Olivier Alain
Wilhelm Friedemann Bach		Sonata in F major
Béla Bartók	Concerto for two pianos and orchestra	
Johannes Brahms		Variations on a theme of Haydn
Benjamin Britten	Scottish Ballad	
Claude Debussy		En blanc et noir
Gian Francesco Malipiero	Concerto for two pianos and orchestra	
Bohuslav Martinů	Concerto for two pianos and orchestra	Three Czech Danses for two pianos
