= Willi and Louis Thern =

Hungarian pianists

Vilmos (Willi, Willy or Wilhelm) Thern (22 June 1847 – 7 April 1911) and Lajos (Louis) Thern (18 December 1848 – 12 March 1920) were Hungarian pianists and teachers of German descent. They were the sons of the composer and conductor Károly Thern.

Willi was born in Pest, Louis in Buda. They studied under their father; Louis had further study in Leipzig under Ignaz Moscheles and Carl Reinecke, and made his debut at the Gewandhaus. They formed a famous piano duo, appearing from 1866 onwards. They were heard annually in London and Liverpool, made many tours of Belgium, the Netherlands and Germany, and in Paris they played in fashionable salons and were friendly with people such as Prince Metternich, Baron d'Erlanger, Rossini and Berlioz.

Their repertoire included works by Franz Liszt, who often attended their concerts and even played with them, as well as Bach, Mozart and Beethoven.

They were also prolific arrangers for piano 4-hands, including:

- Beethoven's First and Third Piano Concertos
- 15 string quartets, a set of piano trios, and 24 symphonies of Joseph Haydn
- three piano quartets, two string quintets and the Octet in E flat, Op. 20 of Felix Mendelssohn.

Both pianists later became piano teachers in Vienna. Willy Thern's best known student was Erwin Schulhoff. Louis's students included Lubka Kolessa and Leo Ascher.

Sergei Bortkiewicz's Russian Dance, Op. 18 for piano duet was dedicated to Louis Thern.

Liszt's transcription for piano 4-hands of four marches by Franz Schubert, S. 632, was dedicated to Willi and Louis Thern.
