= Claire and Antoinette Cann =

British identical twin female pianists

- Born: 1963 (age 62–63); England
- Occupation: Pianists

Claire and Antoinette Cann (born 1963), known professionally as the Cann Twins, are British identical twin sisters and professional pianists who perform together as a piano duo.

== Early life and education ==
Claire and Antoinette Cann were born in England in 1963. They studied at the Watford School of Music with Jean Merlow and Robert Pell, before progressing to the Royal College of Music where they studied with Phyllis Sellick and latterly received the President's Rosebowl.

They won scholarships to Banff School of Fine Arts, Canada.

== Career ==
=== Performing ===
Since turning professional in the 1980s they have toured extensively throughout Europe, Canada, USA, New Zealand and the Far East. They perform frequent concerts in the U.K. at venues including the Royal Albert Hall, the International Series at the Royal Festival Hall, Barbican Hall, Fairfield Halls Croydon, Colston Hall, Bristol, St. David's Hall, Cardiff, Theatre Royal Concert Hall, Nottingham and the Glasgow Royal Concert Hall.

They have performed with orchestras including the Royal Philharmonic Orchestra and Concert Orchestra, the London Philharmonic Orchestra, the BBC Concert Orchestra, the Philomusica of London, the Wren Orchestra and the London Mozart Players.

They were invited by Queen Elizabeth The Queen Mother to perform at the Royal Lodge in Windsor Great Park for Her Majesty Queen Elizabeth II.

=== Broadcasting ===
They have made radio broadcasts in Canada, Denmark, Germany, Israel and New Zealand, plus both Classic FM and BBC Radio 3 in the UK. Their television appearances include: the UK, Japan, USA and New Zealand.

=== Recording ===
The sisters first published CD recording, Fantasy, was described by the Penguin Guide to Compact Discs as "delightful and generous, ...plenty of virtuosity and, ... especially enjoyable transcriptions; both the Sleeping Beauty Suite and the Polovtsian Dances are sparkling examples".

The second recording, Reflections was the Classic FM Critic's Choice. It was described as catching "... the shimmering tone colours of Ravel's Introduction and Allegro to perfection. No less impressive was Fauré's Dolly Suite".

Their third recording, La Danse, was selected in HMV's Top 49 CDs. Gramophone Magazine described it as "a delightful record, ... scintillating in their two-piano and piano-duet format, ... totally winning without any preciosity or self-consciousness."

=== Teaching ===
They give masterclasses in both Europe and America where they are Visiting Professors. The schools include the Royal College of Music, London, Royal Northern College of Music, Manchester, Stetson University, Florida, and Loyola University, New Orleans.

=== Commissions ===
Premieres and works written for them include:

- The world premiere of Timothy Blinko's Gemini Concerto with the English Sinfonia was commissioned by SoundSense.
- The South Bank premiere of the Concerto for Two Pianos and Orchestra by Max Bruch was performed at the Royal Festival Hall.
- The world premiere of Terry Winter Owens' Intimations of Celestial Events for Trumpet (Antoinette) and Piano (Claire) was held in New York.
- The world premiere of the Variations for Two Pianos, Op. 19 by Geoffrey Winters was given in Cambridge on 2 October 2008, nearly fifty years after it had been composed.

== Discography ==
The twins have released three albums of piano music:

=== Fantasy ===
Track listing

1. Rimsky-Korsakoff (arr. Rachmaninoff), Flight of the Bumble Bee
2. Rachmaninoff, 18th Variation from Rhapsody on a Theme of Paganini
3. Tchaikovsky (arr. Rachmaninoff), Sleeping Beauty Suite
4. Michael Elliot, Berceuse pour deux
5. Ravel, 3 movements from Mother Goose Suite
6. Borodin (arr. Cann) Polovtsian Dances
7. Terry Winter Owens, Pianophoria No. 3
8. Gershwin (arr. Grainger), Fantasy on Porgy and Bess

=== Reflections ===
Track listing

1. Rachmaninoff, Suite No. 2 Op. 17
2. Ravel, Introduction and Allegro
3. William Walton, Popular Song from Façade
4. Gabriel Fauré, Dolly Suite Op. 56
5. Poulenc, L'embarquement pour Cythère
6. Schubert, Fantasia in F minor Op. 103

=== La Danse ===
Track listing

1. Saint-Saëns, Danse Macabre
2. Debussy, Petite Suite
3. Tchaikovsky (arr. Cann) Dances from The Nutcracker Suite
4. Brahms, Variations on the St. Anthony Choral
5. Edward MacDowell, Hexentanz
6. Brahms, Waltzes from Op. 39
7. Liszt, Hungarian Rhapsody No. 2

== Awards ==
They have been awarded :

- Gramophone 'Critic's Choice',
- Classic FM 'Critic's Choice',
- HMV 'Best 49 CDs'
- A rosette in 'The Penguin Guide to Recorded Classical Music (formerly The Penguin Guide to Compact Discs).
