= Károly Thern =

Hungarian composer

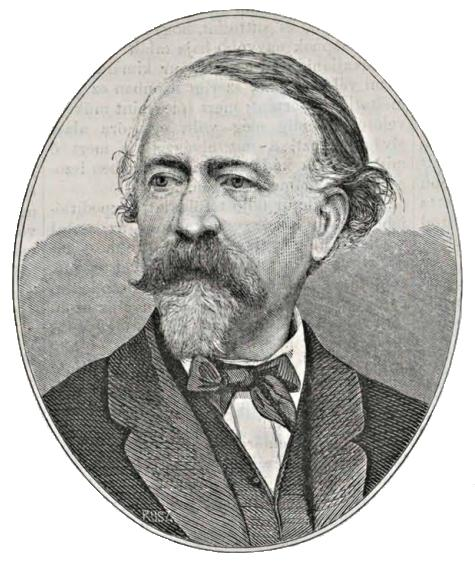
Károly Thern

Károly (Carl) Thern (13 August 1817 – 13 April 1886) was a Hungarian composer, pianist, conductor and arranger. He was of German descent, but was among the second generation of composers who developed the language of Hungarian art music.

Thern was born in 1817, in Spišská Nová Ves (Zipser Neudorf in German, Iglo in Hungarian; now in Slovakia).

He conducted at the National Theatre of Pest in 1840s, and at the Music Lovers' Association of Pest between 1868 and 1873, in succession to Mihály Mosonyi. He was also active as a teacher at the National Conservatory.

Thern's incidental music included Svatopluk by József Gaál (1839) in which he introduced the tárogató alongside standard orchestral instruments. His operas included Gizul (premiered 21 December 1841), The Siege of Tihany (Tihany ostroma; 12 April 1845), and The Would-be Invalid (A képzelt beteg; 11 October 1855). Gizul was described as a "... remarkable reflection of the endeavour to give [its] schooling [i.e. musical technique] a Hungarian character, to adorn it as if it were in Hungarian garment". His other music includes a Symphony (1871); a Trio in D minor for two violins and viola, Op. 60; a Hungarian March for piano 6-hands; Landleben, 8 Character Pieces for piano, Op. 38; a Nocturne for solo piano, and songs for plays about Hungarian village life. Thern's music has been rediscovered by the Hungarian pianist Ilona Prunyi.

Karoly Thern made a number of arrangements for piano duet or two pianos, including:

- Grieg's Piano Concerto in A minor (commenced by Grieg and added to by Thern; Thern's version was published in Leipzig in 1876 and has been recently recorded for the first time)
- Beethoven's 4th Piano Concerto
- Liszt's Hungarian Rhapsody No. 15 "Rakoczy March" (under the pseudonym "Reth. N. Karoly")
- Schumann's Andante and Variations for 2 pianos, 2 cellos and horn, Op. 46
- Karl Goldmark's Overture Sakuntala, Op. 13
- Robert Volkmann's Variations on a Theme of Handel, Op. 26.

His sons Willi and Louis Thern were his best piano students, and they became a famous team of duo pianists and later teachers.

Thern was an ardent champion of Franz Liszt, who used his melody Fóti dal in his Hungarian Rhapsody No. 1. Liszt dedicated Eucharistia to Karoly Thern, and his arrangement for piano 4-hands of the marches by Franz Schubert to his sons Willi and Louis.

Thern died in Vienna in 1886.
