= List of compositions for piano duo =

This article lists compositions written for piano duo. The list includes works for piano four-hands and works for two pianos. Catalogue number and date of composition are also included. Ordering is by composer surname.

A list of notable performers who played and recorded these works is at List of classical piano duos (performers).

== Piano four hands ==
- Anton Arensky (1861–1906)
  - Twelve Pieces, Op. 66 (1903)
- Eleanor Alberga (b. 1949)
  - 3-Day Mix (1991)
- Johann Christian Bach (1735–1782)
  - Sonata for keyboard 4-hands, Op. 15 No. 6 (1778)
  - Sonata for keyboard 4-hands, Op. 18 No. 5 (1781)
  - Sonata for keyboard 4-hands, Op. 18 No. 6 (1781)
- Samuel Barber (1910–1981)
  - Souvenirs, Op. 28 (1951)
- Ludwig van Beethoven (1770–1827)
  - Sonata for Piano 4 hands in D major, Op. 6 (1797)
  - 3 Marches, Op. 45 (1803)
  - Fugue for Piano, four hands, Op. 134 (1826, arrangement of Große Fuge, Op. 133)
- Luciano Berio (1925–2003)
  - Touch (1991)
  - Canzonetta (1991)
- Georges Bizet (1838–1875)
  - Jeux d'enfants, Op. 22 (1871)
- Johannes Brahms (1833–1897)
  - Variations on a theme by Robert Schumann, Op. 23 (1861)
  - Sixteen Waltzes, Op. 39 (1865)
  - Ungarische Tänze, WoO 1 (1869–80)
- Ferruccio Busoni (1866–1924)
  - Fuge über das Volkslied "O, du mein lieber Augustin", BV 226 (1888)
  - Finnländische Volksweisen, BV 227 (1888)
- Charles Camilleri
  - Paganiana: variations for piano four-hands (1968)
- Emmanuel Chabrier (1841–1894)
  - Pas redoublé (Cortège burlesque) (1881)
  - Prélude et marche française (1885)
  - Souvenirs de Munich, Quadrille sur les thèmes favoris de Tristan et Isolde de Richard Wagner (1887)
- Muzio Clementi (1752–1832)
  - 3 Duets, Op. 3, No. 1-3 (1779)
  - Duet, Op. 6, No. 1 (1780)
  - 3 Duets, Op. 14 (1785)
- Claude Debussy (1862–1918)
  - Symphony in B minor, L. 10 (1880–81)
  - Divertissement, L. 36 (1884)
  - Petite Suite, L. 65a (1888–89)
  - Marche ecossaise sur un theme populaire, L. 77 (1891)
  - Six épigraphes antiques, L. 131 (1914, used music from Musique de scene pour Les Chansons de Bilitis)
- David Del Tredici (born 1937)
  - Carioca Boy – Tango (2009)
- Antonín Dvořák (1841–1904)
  - Legends, Op. 59 (1881)
  - Slavonic Dances, Opp. 46 and 72 (1878, 1886)
  - Ze Šumavy, Op. 68 (1883)
- Gabriel Fauré (1845–1924)
  - Dolly Suite, Op. 56 (1894–97)
  - Allegro symphonique, Op. 68 (1895)
- Morton Feldman (1926–1987)
  - Piano Three Hands for piano three-hands (1957)
  - Piano Four Hands (1958)
- Jean Françaix (1912–1997)
  - Ronde Louis XV and Le Hameau from Si Versailles m'était conté (1953)
  - Napoléon (1954)
  - 15 Portraits of Children from Auguste Renoir (1971)
- Antón García Abril (1933–2021)
  - Zapateado (1995)
  - Homenaje a Copérnico (2009)
- Anthony Gilbert (1934-2023)
  - Piano Sonata No. 2 (1966-67)
- Leopold Godowsky (1870–1938)
  - 46 Miniatures (1918)
- Edvard Grieg (1843–1907)
  - In Autumn, Op. 11 (1866)
  - 2 Symphonic Pieces, Op. 14 (1863–64, arranged from Symphony No. 1)
  - Norwegian Dances, Op. 35 (1881)
  - Waltz-Caprices, Op. 37 (1883)
- Carlos Guastavino (1912–2000)
  - Romance del Plata - Sonatina (1987)
- Josef Matthias Hauer (1883–1959)
  - Zwölftonspiel (21 March 1952)
  - Zwölftonspiel (April–May 1952)
  - Zwölftonspiel (24 June 1952)
  - Zwölftonspiel with poem of E. Lasker-Schüler (28 June 1952)
  - Zwölftonspiel (10 July 1952)
  - Zwölftonspiel (April 1955)
  - Zwölftonspiel (May 1955)
  - Zwölftonspiel (13 January 1956)
  - Zwölftonspiel (April 1956)
  - Zwölftonspiel (July 1956)
  - Zwölftonspiel (October 1956)
  - Zwölftonspiel (July 1957)
- Swan Hennessy (1866–1929)
  - Petite suite irlandaise, d'après des airs anciens de la collection Petrie, Op. 29 (1909)
- Paul Hindemith (1895–1963)
  - Eight Waltzes, Drei wunderschöne Mädchen im Schwarzwald, Op. 6 (1916)
  - Sonata for piano four-hands (1938)
- Alan Hovhaness (1911–2000)
  - Child in the Garden, Op. 168 (1958)
- Marie Jaëll (1846-1925)
  - Valses pour piano á quatre mains, Op. 8 - piano four-hands
  - Voix du Printemps - piano four-hands
- György Kurtág (born 1926)
  - Suite (1950–51)
  - Játékok, volumes IV and VIII (1979, 2010)
- Constant Lambert (1905-1951)
  - Trois Pièces Nègres pour les Touches Blanches (1949)
- Edward Lambert (1951-)
  - Aspects of Work (2016)
- György Ligeti (1923–2006)
  - Induló (March) (1942)
  - Polifón etüd (Polyphonic Étude) (1943)
  - Allegro (1943)
  - Három lakodalmi tánc (Three Wedding Dances) (1950)
  - Sonatina (1950)
- Franz Liszt (1811–1886)
  - Festpolonaise, S. 255 (renumbered as 619a)
  - Variation über das Thema von Borodin, S. 256 (renumbered as 207a)
- Bohuslav Martinů (1890–1959)
  - Avec un doigt for piano 3-hands, H 185 (1930)
- Felix Mendelssohn (1809–1847)
  - Allegro brillant, Op. 92 (1841)
- Darius Milhaud (1892–1974)
  - Enfantines, Suite after 3 poèmes de Jean Cocteau, Op. 59a (1920)
  - Scaramouche, Suite in three movements after incidental music for Moliere's Le Médecin Volant and the opera, Bolivar, Op. 165 (1937)
- Wolfgang Amadeus Mozart (1756–1791)
  - Sonata in C major, K. 19d (1765)
  - Sonata in B♭ major, K. 358/186c (1773–74)
  - Sonata in D major, K. 381/123a (1773–74)
  - Fugue in G minor, K. 401/375e (1773)
  - Sonata in F major, K. 497 (1786)
  - Andante and Variations in G major, K. 501 (1786)
  - Sonata in C major, K. 521 (1787)
- Lior Navok (1971)
  - At the Edge of a Spiral (2004)
- Francis Poulenc (1899–1963)
  - Sonata for piano four hands, FP 8 (1918, 1939)
- Sergei Rachmaninoff (1873–1943)
  - Suite No. 1 (or Fantaisie-Tableaux for two pianos)(1893)
  - Six Morceaux, Op. 11 (1894)
  - Suite No. 2 (1901)
  - Polka Italienne (1906)
- Maurice Ravel (1875–1937)
  - Shéhérazade (1898)
  - Ma mère l'oye (1910)
- Max Reger (1873–1916)
  - Twelve Caprice Waltzes, Op. 9 (1892)
  - Twenty German Dances, Op. 10 (1892)
  - Six Waltzes, Op. 22 (1898)
  - Cinq pièces pittoresques, Op. 34 (1899)
  - Sechs Burlesken, Op. 58 (1901)
  - Six Pieces, Op. 94 (1906)
  - Introduction and Passacaglia for Organ in D Minor (1914)
  - Variations and Fugue on a Theme by Mozart, Op. 132 (1914; arrangement by the composer)
- Wolfgang Rihm (1952-2024)
  - Klavierstück Nr. 3 (1971/1999; op. 8c)
  - Mehrere kurze Walzer (1979–88)
- Camille Saint-Saëns (1835–1921)
  - Duettino, Op. 11 (1855)
  - König Harald Harfagar, Op. 59 (1880)
  - Feuillet d'album, Op. 81 (1887)
  - Pas redoublé, Op. 86 (1887)
  - Berceuse, Op. 105 (1896)
  - Marche dédiée aux étudiants d'Alger, with chorus ad lib, Op. 163 (1921)
- Erik Satie (1866–1925)
  - Trois morceaux en forme de poire (1903)
  - Aperçus désagréables (1908, 1912)
  - En habit de cheval (1911)
- Alfred Schnittke (1934-1998)
  - Sonatina for piano four hands (1995)
- Franz Schubert (1797–1828)
  - Four Polonaises, Op. 75, D 599 (1818)
  - Trois Marches héroiques, Op. 27, D 602 (1818 or 1824)
  - Notre amitié est invariable, Op. posth. 138, D 608 (1818)
  - Sonata in B♭ major, Op.30, D 617 (1818)
  - Eight Variations on a French Song, Op. 10, D 624 (1818)
  - Overture in F major, Op. 34, D 675 (1819)
  - Trois Marches militaires, Op. 51, D. 733 (1818)
  - Overture to the Opera Alfonso und Estrella, Op. 69, D 773 (1823)
  - Grand Duo, Op. posth. 140, D. 812 (1824)
  - Eight Variations on an Original Theme, Op. 35, D 813 (1824)
  - Divertissement à la hongroise, Op. 54, D 818 (1824)
  - Six Grandes Marches, Op. 40, D 819 (1818 or 1824)
  - Divertissement sur des motifs originaux français, Op. 63 and Op. 84 No. 1-2, D 823 (1826–27)
  - Six Polonaises, Op. 61, D 824 (1826)
  - Grande Marche funèbre, Op. 55, D 859 (1825)
  - Grande Marche héroique, Op. 66, D 885 (1826)
  - Eight Variations on a Theme from Hérold's Opera Marie, Op. 82 No. 1, D 908 (1827)
  - Fantasy in F minor, Op. 103, D. 940 (1828)
  - Lebensstürme, Op. posth. 144, D. 947 (1828)
  - Grand Rondeau, Op. 107, D. 951 (1828)
  - Fugue in E minor, Op. posth. 152, D 952 (1828)
  - Introduction, Four Variations on an Original Theme and Finale, Op. posth. 82 No. 2, D 968A
  - Deux Marches caractéristiques, Op. posth. 121, D 968B
- Robert Schumann (1810–1856)
  - Bilder aus Osten, Op. 66 (1848)
  - 12 Piano Pieces for Young and Older Children, Op. 85 (1849)
  - Ball-Scenen, Op. 109 (1851)
  - Kinderball, Op. 130 (1853)
- Juan María Solare (born 1966)
  - FAQ (Frequently Asked Questions) (2002)
  - Milonga Nunca Más (1994+2007)
  - Orangutango (2008)
  - Reencuentro (2008)
  - Quince bajo cero (tango para Juliana) (2010)
  - Conjeturas sistemáticas (2013)
  - Persecuta (2013)
  - They go (2014)
  - Plena (2013/17)
  - Vendetta (2017)
  - Tea Stories (2017/21)
  - Disuasión (2022)
  - Gesichter des Menschlichen (2025)
- Karlheinz Stockhausen (1928–2007)
  - Intervall, from Für kommende Zeiten, Nr. 33 (1968–70)
- Igor Stravinsky (1882–1971)
  - Trois pièces faciles (1915)
  - Rite of Spring (1913). Arr. by Igor Stravinsky
  - Cinq pièces faciles (1917)
- Stella Sung (b. 1959)
  - Epicycles (1992)
- Josef Tal (1910–2008)
  - Pieces for piano four hands (1931)
  - A Little Walk for piano four hands (1951)
  - A Tale in Four Parts for piano 4-hands (1988)
- Carl Vine (1954)
  - Sonata for piano four hands (2009)
- Bruno Vlahek (1986)
  - Sonata, Op. 21 (2008)
  - Variations on a Croatian folk theme, Op. 38 (2013)
- Peter Warlock
  - Capriol Suite (1926)
- Charles Wuorinen (1938–2020)
  - Making Ends Meet (1966)
- Juan Carlos Zorzi (1935–1999)
  - Música para calesita (ca. 1980)

== Two pianos ==
- John Adams (born 1947)
  - Hallelujah Junction (1996)

- Eleanor Alberga (b. 1949)
  - Two-Piano Suite (1986)
- Anton Arensky (1861–1906)
  - Suite No. 1, Op. 15 (1888)
  - Suite No. 2, Silhouettes, Op. 23 (1892)
  - Suite No. 3, Variations, Op. 33 (1894)
  - Suite No. 4, Op. 62 (1903)
  - Suite No. 5, Children's Suite, op. 65
- Johann Christian Bach (1735–1782)
  - Sonata in G Major for two harpsichords or two pianos, Op. 15, No. 5 (1778)
- Béla Bartók (1881–1945)
  - Seven pieces from Mikrokosmos, Sz. 108 (1926–39)
- Arnold Bax (1883–1953)
  - Fantasia (1900)
  - Moy Mell (1916)
  - Hardanger (1927)
  - The Poisoned Fountain (1928)
  - The Devil that tempted St Anthony (1928)
  - Sonata for two pianos (1929)
  - Red Autumn (1931)
- Luciano Berio (1925–2003)
  - Wasserklavier (1965)
- Claude Bolling (1930–2020)
  - Sonata for Two Pianists 1 and 2 (1989)
- Pierre Boulez (1925–2016)
  - Structures I and II (1952, 1961)
- Johannes Brahms (1833–1897)
  - Sonata in F minor, Op. 34b (1863)
  - Waltzes, Op. 39 (1865)
  - Variations on a Theme by Haydn, Op. 56b (1873)
- Mia Brentano
  - Mia Brentano's Hidden Sea: 20 Songs for 2 Pianos (2018)

- Benjamin Britten (1913–1976)
  - Introduction and Rondo alla burlesca, Op. 23 No. 1 (1940)
  - Mazurka Elegiaca, Op. 23 No. 2 (1941)
- David Brubeck (1920–2012)
  - Points on Jazz (1961)
- Ferruccio Busoni (1866–1924)
  - Prelude and Fugue in C Minor, BV 99 (1878)
  - Improvisation on the Bach Chorale "Wie wohl ist mir, o Freund der Seele", BV 271b (1916)
  - Duettino concertante after Mozart, BV B 88 (1919)
  - Fantasia contrappuntistica, BV 256b (1922)
- Sylvano Bussotti (1931-2021)
  - Tableaux Vivantes (1964)
- John Cage (1912–1992)
  - A Book of Music for two prepared pianos (1944)
  - Experiences No. 1 (1945)
  - Three Dances for two prepared pianos (1945)
  - Furniture Music Etcetera (1980)
  - Two^{2} (1989)
- Cornelius Cardew (1936-1981)
  - Two Books of Study for Pianists (1958)
  - Boolavogue (1981)
- Jacques Castérède (born 1926)
  - Crosses on Fire for 2 pianos (Feux croisés pour deux pianos) (1963)
- Emmanuel Chabrier (1841–1894)
  - Trois valses romantiques (1883)
- Frédéric Chopin (1810–1849)
  - Rondo in C major, Op. posth. 73 (1828)
- Muzio Clementi (1752–1832)
  - Duet (Sonata) in B♭ major, Op. 1a No. 6 (1781)
  - Duet (Sonata) in B♭ major, Op. 12 No. 5 (1784?)
- Aaron Copland (1900-1990)
  - Billy the Kid (1938) (Ballet suite, arr. Copland)
  - Dance of the Adolescent (1933) (from Grogh, arr. Copland)
  - Danza de Jalisco (1963)
  - Danzón Cubano (1942)
  - El Salón México (arr. Bernstein) (1943)
  - Two Movements from Rodeo: Hoe Down and Saturday Night Waltz (arr. Gold and Fizdale) (1950)
- Claude Debussy (1862–1918)
  - Trois Nocturnes, (1892–1899). Arr. by Maurice Ravel (1910)
  - Lindaraja, L. 97 (1901)
  - En blanc et noir, L. 134 (1915)
- Henri Dutilleux (1916–2013)
  - Figures de résonances (1970–76)
- George Enescu (1881–1955)
  - Variations on an Original Theme in A♭ major, Op. 5 (1898)
- Morton Feldman (1926–1987)
  - Projection 3 (1951)
  - Intermission 6 for one or two pianos (1953)
  - Two Pieces for Two Pianos (1954)
  - Two Pianos (1957)
  - Work for Two Pianists (1958)
  - Vertical Thoughts I (1963)
- Brian Ferneyhough (born 1943)
  - Sonata for two pianos (1966)
- Michael Finnissy (born 1946)
  - Wild Flowers (1974)
  - his voice / was then / here waiting (1996)
  - Eighteenth-Century Novels (Fanny Hill) (2006)
  - Derde symfonische etude (2013)
- Jean Françaix (1912–1997)
  - Huit danses exotiques (1957)
- Antón García Abril (1933–2021)
  - Madrid (1998)
- Philip Glass (born 1937)
  - In Again Out Again (1967)
  - Four Movements for Two Pianos (2008)
- Karel Goeyvaerts (1923–1993)
  - Sonata for Two Pianos (1950–51)
- Percy Grainger (1882–1961)
  - Hill Song No. 1 and No. 2 (1922)
- Donald Grantham (b. 1947)
  - Fantasy Variations on Gershwin's Prelude II for Two Pianos (1996)
- Edvard Grieg (1843–1907)
  - Old Norwegian Melody with Variations, Op. 51 (1890)
- Jorge Grundman (born 1961)
  - (There Are) Not So Many Different Rains, Op. 79 (2021)
  - I Will Stop Loving You When the Waves Stop, Op. 86 (2021)
- Carlos Guastavino (1912–2000)
  - Tres Romances argentinos
- Reynaldo Hahn (1874–1947)

Le Ruban Dénué (1917)

- Hans Werner Henze (1926–2012)
  - Divertimenti per due pianoforti (1964)
- Paul Hindemith (1895–1963)
  - Sonata for two pianos (1942)
- Arthur Honegger (1892–1955)
  - Partita, H 139 (1940)
- Alan Hovhaness (1911–2000)
  - Vijag, Op. 37 (1946)
  - Mihr, Op. 60 (1945)
  - Ko-ola-u, Op. 136 (1962)
  - O Lord, Bless Thy Mountains for 2 pianos tuned a quarter-tone apart, Op. 276 (1974)
- Dorothy Howell (1898–1982)
  - Spindrift (1920)
  - Recuerdos Preciosos (1934)
  - Mazurka (1937)
- Manuel Infante (1883–1958)
  - 3 Danzas Andaluzas (1922)
- Charles Ives (1874–1954)
  - Burlesque Storm
  - Three Quarter-Tone Pieces for 2 pianos tuned a quarter-tone apart
- Thomas Henderson Kerr Jr. (1915-1988)
  - Concert Scherzo: Didn't My Lord Deliver Daniel? for Two Pianos (1940)
- Nikolai Kapustin (1937–2020)
  - Paraphrase On Dizzy Gillespile's Manteca, Op. 129 (2006)
- György Ligeti (1923–2006)
  - Three Pieces – Monument – Selbstporträt – Bewegung (1976)
- Franz Liszt (1811–1886)
  - Grosses Konzertstück über Themen aus Mendelssohns Lieder ohne Worte, S. 257 (1834)
  - Concerto pathétique, S. 258 (1855,66)
  - Réminiscences de Don Juan, S. 656 (1877). Arr. Franz Liszt
- Witold Lutosławski (1913–1994)
  - Variations on a Theme by Paganini (1941)
- Peter Machajdík (1961)
  - It's not the Mist for two pianos (2018)
  - Déjà vu for two pianos (2015)
- Andrew March (1973)
  - Nymphéas for Two Pianos (2001) ()
- Bohuslav Martinů (1890–1959)
  - La Fantaisie, H 180 (1929)
  - Trois Danses Tchèques pour deux pianos, H 324 (1949)
  - Impromptu, H 359 (1956)
- Grace-Evangeline Mason (1994–)
  - Pinhole Planetarium, Seeing Stars (2018)
- Felix Mendelssohn (1809–1847)
  - Duo concertant, WoO 25 (1833)
- Olivier Messiaen (1908–1992)
  - Visions de l'Amen (1943)
- Darius Milhaud (1892–1974)
  - Scaramouche, Op. 165b, after the incidental music Le médécin volant (1937)
  - Carnaval à la Nouvelle-Orléans, Op. 275 (1947)
- Wolfgang Amadeus Mozart (1756–1791)
  - Fugue in C minor, K. 426 (1783)
  - Sonata in D major, K. 448/375a (1781)
  - Sonata in C major, K. 545 (1788). Arr. by Edvard Grieg
- Lior Navok (1971)
  - The Little Mermaid, for two pianos and chamber ensemble / orchestra (2006)
- Luis de Pablo (1930-2021)
  - Móvil I (1957)
  - Amable sombra (1989)
- Astor Piazzolla (1921–1992)
  - Suite portena de ballet
  - Milonga del Ángel (arr. P. Ziegler) (1962)
  - La Muerte del Ángel (arr. P. Ziegler) (1962)

- Francis Poulenc (1899–1963)
  - Le voyage en Amérique, FP 149 (1951, music for film)
  - L'Embarquement pour Cythère, FP 150 (1951, after Le voyage en Amérique)
  - Sonata for Two Pianos, FP 156 (1953)
  - Capriccio for 2 pianos, FP 155 (1952, after Le bal Masqué)
  - Elégie (en accords alternés), FP 175 (1959)
- Sergei Rachmaninoff (1873–1943)
  - Russian Rhapsody in E minor (1891)
  - Suite No. 1, Op. 5 (1893)
  - Suite No. 2, Op. 17 (1901)
  - Symphonic Dances, Op. 45 (1940). Arr. by Sergei Rachmaninoff
- Maurice Ravel (1875–1937)
  - Sites auriculaires (1895–97)
  - Rapsodie espagnole (1907)
  - La Valse. Arr. by Maurice Ravel
- Alan Rawsthorne (1905–1971)
  - Concerto for Two Pianos and Orchestra (1968)
- Max Reger (1873–1916)
  - Variations and Fugue on a Theme by Beethoven, Op. 86 (1904)
  - Introduction, Passacaglia and Fugue in B Minor, Op. 96 (1906)
  - Variations and Fugue on a Theme by Mozart, Op. 132a (1914; arrangement by the composer)
- Wolfgang Rihm (1952-2024)
  - Sätze (1970; op. 6)
  - Maske (1985)
  - Über-Schrift (1992–2003)
- Camille Saint-Saëns (1835–1921)
  - Variations sur un thème de Beethoven, Op. 35 (1874)
  - Caprice arabe, Op. 96 (1884)
  - Polonaise, Op. 77 (1885)
  - Scherzo, Op. 87 (1889)
  - Caprice héroïque, Op. 106 (1898)
- Robert Schumann (1810–1856)
  - Andante and variations, Op. 46, (1843)
- Alexander Scriabin (1872–1915)
  - Fantasy in A minor, Op. posth. (1890)
- Dmitri Shostakovich (1906–1975)
  - Suite for Two Pianos, Op. 6 (1922)
  - Concertino, Op. 94 (1953)
- Karlheinz Stockhausen (1928–2007)
  - Mantra (1970)
- Juan María Solare (born 1966)
  - De capa caída (2000)
- Igor Stravinsky (1882–1971)
  - Rite of Spring (1913). Arr. by Vyacheslav Gryaznov
  - Valse des fleurs (1914)
  - Concerto for Two Pianos (1935)
  - Tango (1940). Arr. by Victor Babin
  - Sonata for Two Pianos (1943)
- Adrian Sutton (born 1967)
  - Bicycle Dance In Lanes Of Leaves And Light (1998)
- Attila Szervác (1973-)
  - vostanco – a Libre art canon for 2 pianos (1992)
- Pyotr Ilyich Tchaikovsky (1840-1893)
  - Waltz from the opera Eugene Onegin (1878). Arr. by Victor Babin
- Joan Trimble (1915–2000)
  - The Humours of Carrick (1938)
  - The Bard of Lisgoole (1938)
  - Buttermilk Point (1938)
  - Sonatina (1940)
  - The Green Bough (1941)
  - Pastorale (Hommage à F. Poulenc) (1943)
  - The Gartan Mother's Lullaby (1949)
  - The Heather Glen (1949)
  - Puck Fair (1951)
- Davide Verotta (1958-)
  - Crisp, for two Pianos (2020) Link to YouTube Video Link to IMSLP Score
- Massimiliano Viel (1964-)
  - Corale (1997)
- Jacob Weinberg (1879-1956)
  - Sonata for Two Pianos in E♭ major (1908); unpublished
- Charles Wuorinen (born 1938)
  - The Mission of Virgil (1993)
  - Fifty Fifty (2002) in honor of Oliver Knussen's 50th birthday
- Ivan Wyschnegradsky (1893–1979)
  - The following works are all for 2 pianos tuned a quarter-tone apart:
  - Quatre fragments, Op. 5 (1918)
  - Dithyrambe, Op. 12 (1923–24)
  - Prélude et danse, Op. 16 (1926)
  - 2 Études de concert, Op. 19 (1931)
  - Étude en forme de scherzo, Op. 20 (1931)
  - Prélude et fugue, Op. 21 (1932)
  - 24 Préludes dans tous les tons de l'échelle chromatique diatonisée à 13 sons, Op. 22 (1934, 1960)
  - 2 Fugues, Op. 32 (1951)
  - Études sur les densités et les volumes, Op. 39b (1956)
  - Dialogue à deux, Op. 41 (1958–1973)
  - Composition II, Op. 46b (1960)
  - Intégrations, Op. 49 (1962)
- Tomislav Zografski (1934–2000)
  - Sonatina for Two Pianos Op. 142 (1969)
  - Sonata for Two Pianos Op. 122 (1990)
