= Pekinel Sisters =

Twin Turkish pianists (born 1951)

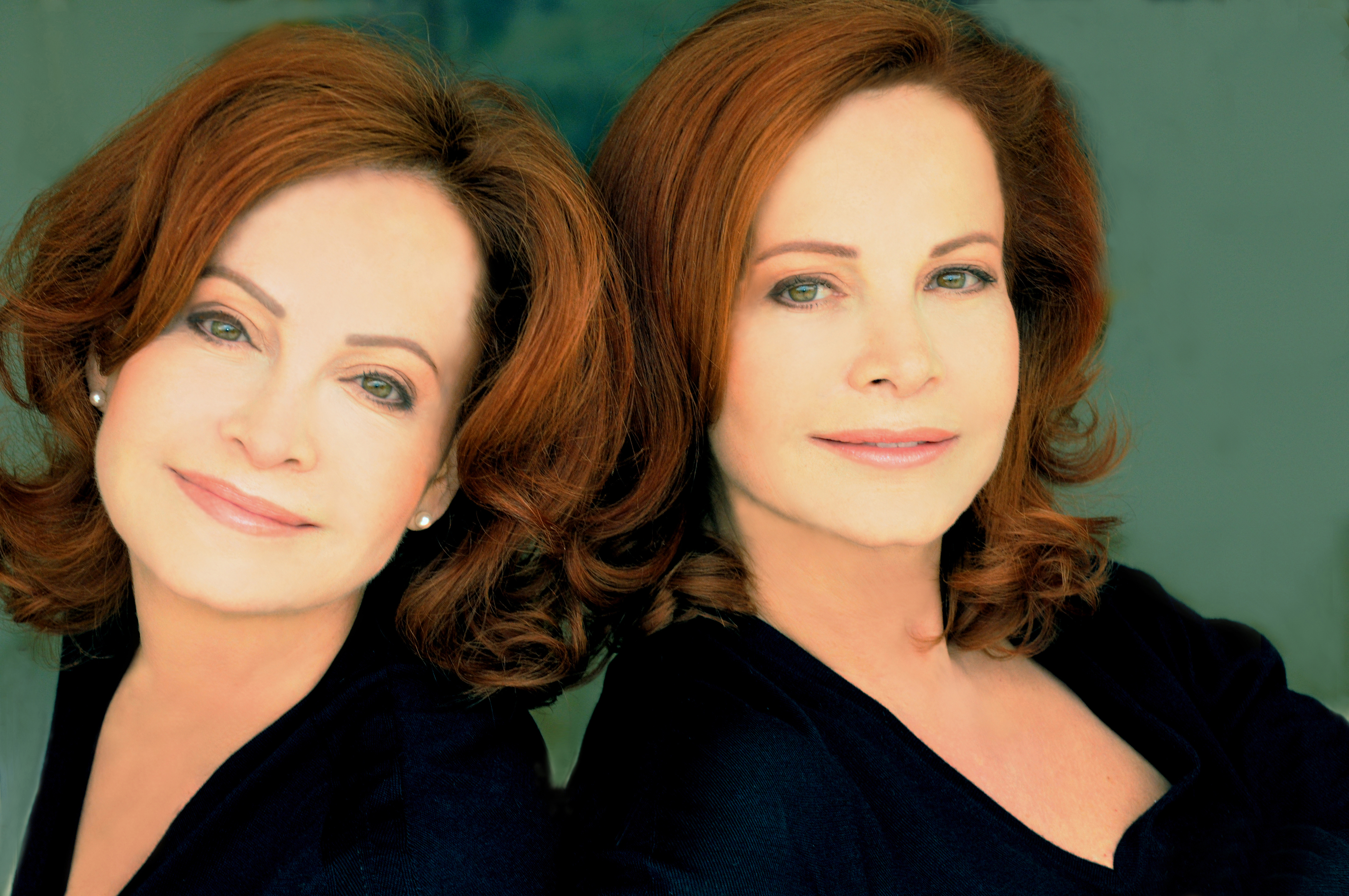
Güher and Süher Pekinel

Güher Pekinel and Süher Pekinel (born March 29, 1951, Istanbul) are twin Turkish pianists performing mostly in duet. The Pekinels are among the world's most well known piano duos.

== Career ==
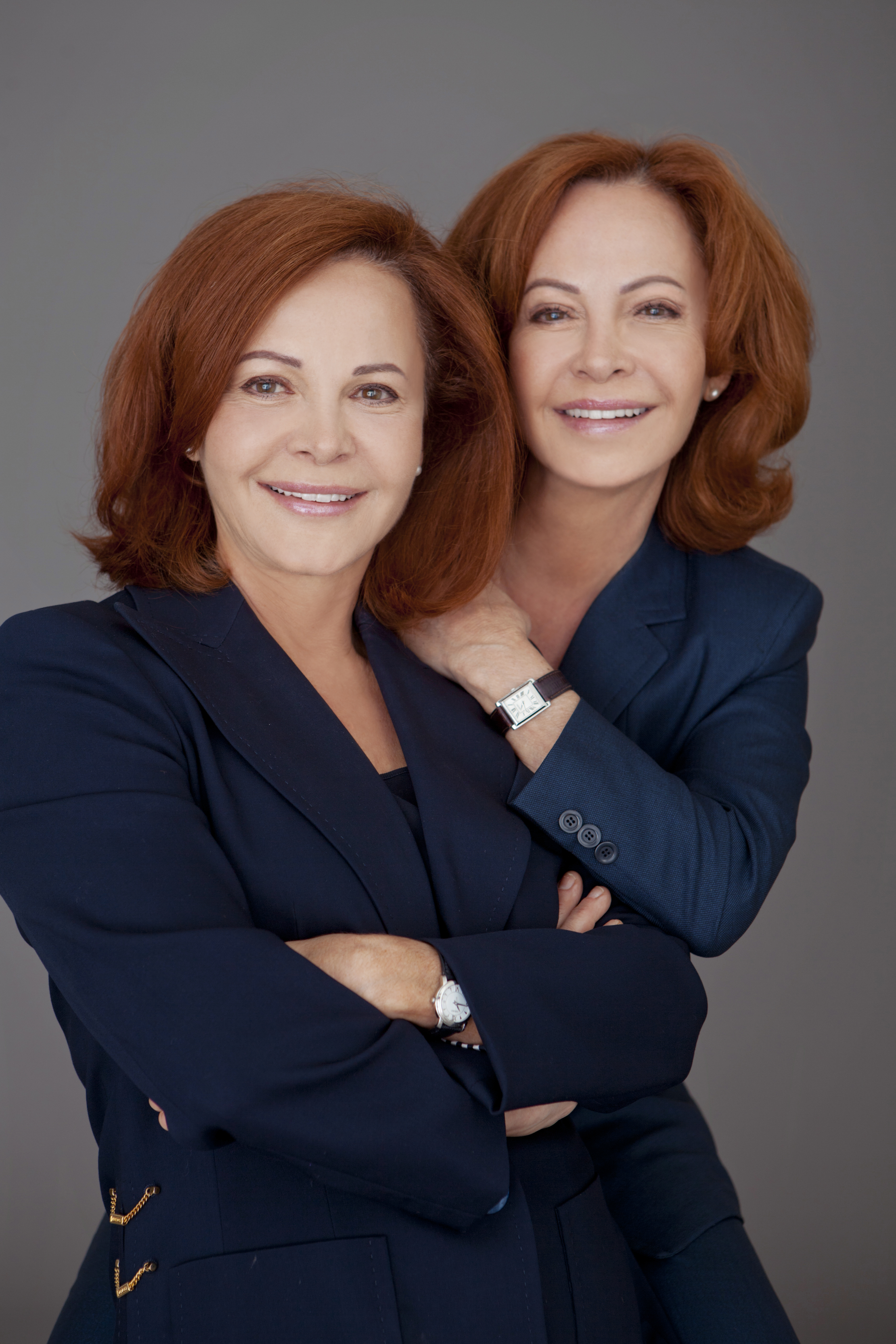
The Pekinels

They appeared in public first at the age of six, and by nine years old they had made their orchestral debut with the Ankara Philharmonic Orchestra. After their education in Paris with Yvonne Loriod and attending the Frankfurter Musikhochschule, the twins were invited by Rudolf Serkin to continue their studies with him at the Curtis Institute of Music in Philadelphia. The sisters completed their musical training at the Juilliard School New York in 1978, having also studied with Claudio Arrau, Leon Fleisher and Adele Marcus.

At the age of 18, the Pekinels shared the first prize at the German National Piano Competition as soloists, followed by several first prizes in national and international competitions in Germany, Italy, France and USA as a duo and also as soloists, including the first prize in representing Germany at the UNESCO World Piano Competition as duo in 1978.

Following their musical training, Güher and Süher Pekinel were first discovered by Herbert von Karajan in 1984 and engaged to appear at the Salzburg Festival, to which they returned frequently in subsequent years. They have since embarked on a worldwide career and played with leading orchestras, including the Berlin, Vienna, New York, Israel and London Philharmonic, Concertgebouw Amsterdam, Leipziger Gewandhaus, Tokyo Philharmonic, Los Angeles Philharmonic and many others. Extended recital and orchestra tours took Güher and Süher Pekinel to the major music centers and most important festivals of Europe, the United States, Asia and Japan.

== Discography ==
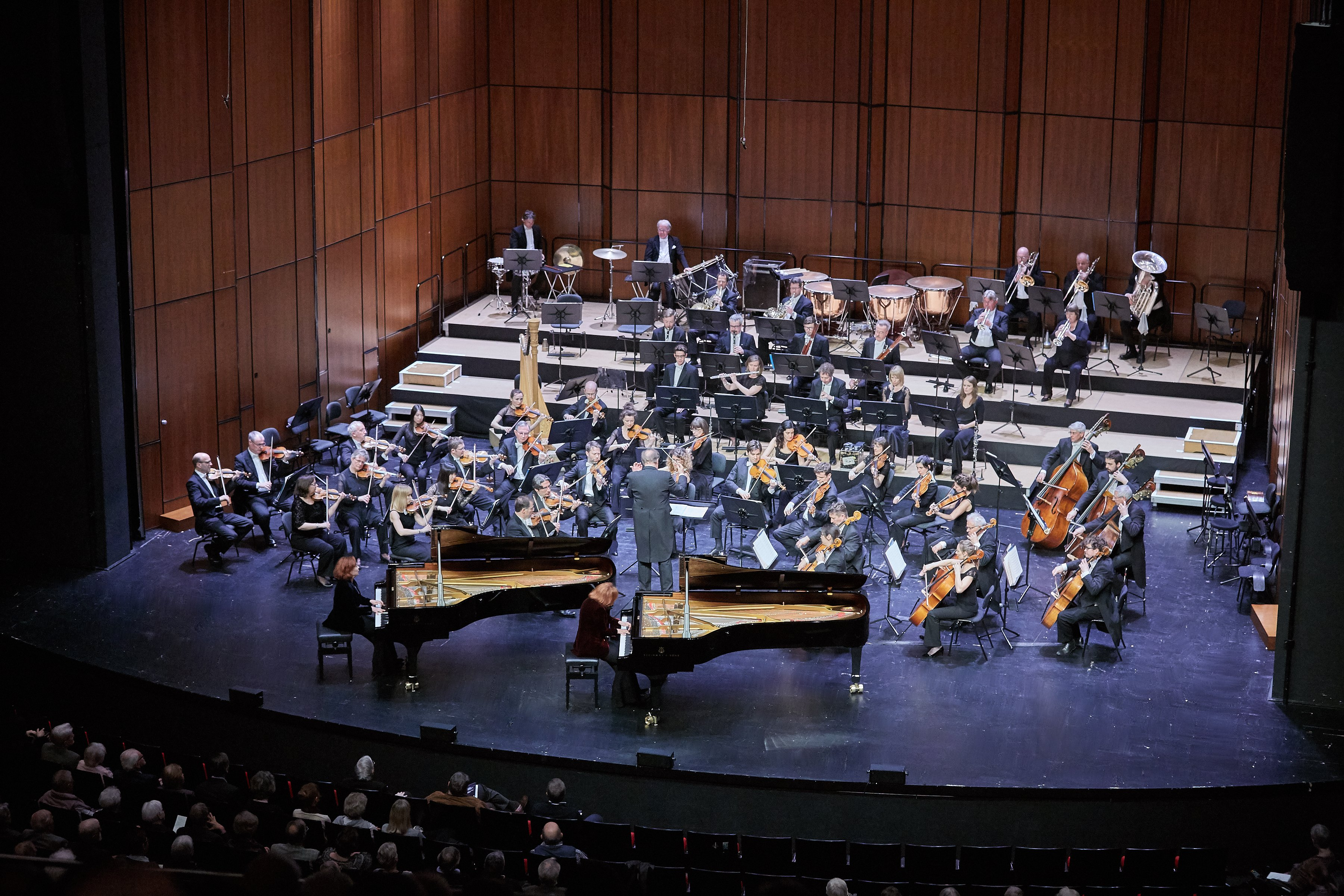
The Pekinels with the London Philharmonic in Basel, Switzerland.

The Pekinels made numerous recordings of most important duo-piano literature for well-known labels such as Deutsche Grammophon, Chandos, CBS, Teldec, Warner Classics and Arthaus / Unitel. Their association with Teldec began in 1990 and later continued with Warner Classics, results a huge music archive within a 25-year collaboration. Their collaboration with world-renowned jazz musician Jacques Loussier on the album “Take Bach”, featuring interpretations of Bach's concertos for two and three pianos, was a worldwide bestseller and was released numerous times by Warner Classics. Shortly after the release of their concert CD with the Zurich Chamber Orchestra and Howard Griffiths in 2006, featuring recital programmes and works by Brahms and Saint-Saens, it was listed as Best Album of the Year by The Daily Telegraph, The Guardian and Gramophone Magazine. In the 2006–2007 season, their entire CD range was re-released by Warner Classics. The Pekinels have appeared on numerous radio and TV shows and have been the subject of two 60-minute documentaries, the first of which was produced by the German ZDF channel and the second entitled “Double Life” was produced by ARD-Arte and was later licensed by Unitel.

A special event was a performance at the opening concert of the Wiener Festwochen in Vienna with the Vienna Philharmonic and Zubin Mehta, which was broadcast live to 32 countries worldwide through the Austrian television. They have given concerts together with the most renowned conductors like Zubin Mehta, Sir Colin Davis, Sir Neville Marriner, Riccardo Chailly, Paavo Jaervi, Michel Plasson, Marek Janowski and Christoph von Dohnányi.

The Güher & Süher Pekinel “Live in Concert” DVD, released by Arthaus Music in February 2010, features the 2007 New Year Concerts in Zurich and Lucerne, along with their other recent performances. Another critically acclaimed Arthaus Music release dated April 2011, the Bach Jazz DVD brought together their ECO concert under the baton of Sir Colin Davis and the duo and trio Bach-Jazz piano concertos with Jacques Loussier.

Celebrating the centennial of the first performance of Igor Stravinsky's “The Rite of Spring”, Decca, DG and Philips released a collection of the most important recordings of that work between 1913 and today, in December 2012. This CD-Box is also including the Pekinels DG recording in 1984. The 50CD-Box Set ‘’Legacy’’ with works of selected artists, released by Erarto/Teldec in November 2013, includes 5 recordings by Pekinels.

Their last DVD and CD with live recordings of Bartok’s Concerto and live recital recordings of Schubert, Mozart, Debussy and Infante, was released in September 2014 by Arthaus / Unitel and was nominated for the 2015 ‘’Preis der Deutschen Schallplattenkritik’’.

The Turkish Government awarded the title "Devlet Sanatçısı" (literally "State Artist" or "National Artist") to the Pekinel sisters in 1991, a rare honor. Güher and Süher Pekinel are holders of honorary doctorate degrees from Boğaziçi University as well as holders of the 2013 Istanbul Culture and Arts Foundation “Honorary Award” for their lifetime achievements.

== Education projects ==
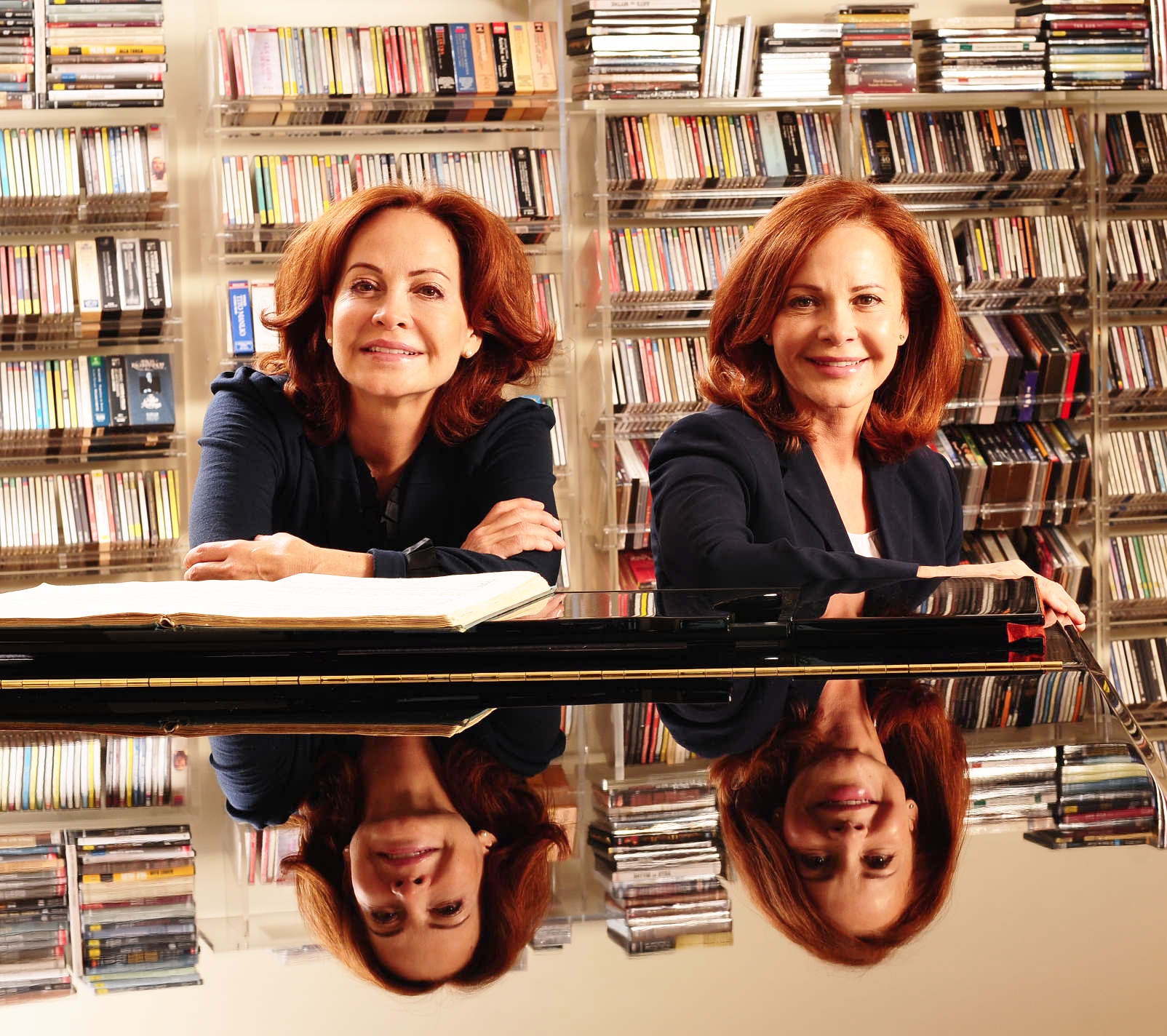
The Pekinels

Güher and Süher Pekinel have also pioneered three significant music education projects.

Their first project aims to further professional music education in Turkey to meet international standards. Entitled “Young Musicians on World Stages”, the project, sponsored by Turkish firm Koç / Tüpraş, supports twelve young musicians by granting them qualitatively instruments and scholarships to study with distinguished musicians and pedagogues in Europe and to participate in international music competitions. Within five years, the scholars have been awarded seven first prizes and four second prizes at international competitions. Pekinel's received the best social responsibility award for their “Young Musicians on World Stages” project in 2011.

Their second project was launched in 2007 by founding the G&S Pekinel Music Department in the private boarding school TEVITÖL for gifted children from throughout Turkey. This scheme has achieved integration for the first time in Turkey into the standard musical curriculum and is now accepted as credit at notable universities.

The third project initiated by Pekinels’ concentrates on their vision to establish the globally implemented Orff Schulwerk Method at kindergartens and primary schools in Turkey to raise the creativity, self-confidence, and analytical skills of children. Since September 2010, the Ministry of National Education has been working within the framework of a joint protocol to ensure that this important project succeeds.

== See also ==
- Önder Sisters
