= Önder Sisters =

Turkish-Austrian musical duo

Ferhan & Ferzan Önder
- Born: Ferhan Önder; Ferzan Önder; 2 October 1965 (age 60); Tokat Province, Turkey
- Genres: Classical music
- Occupation: Pianist
- Instrument: Piano
- Years active: 1975–present
- Website: ferhan-and-ferzan.com

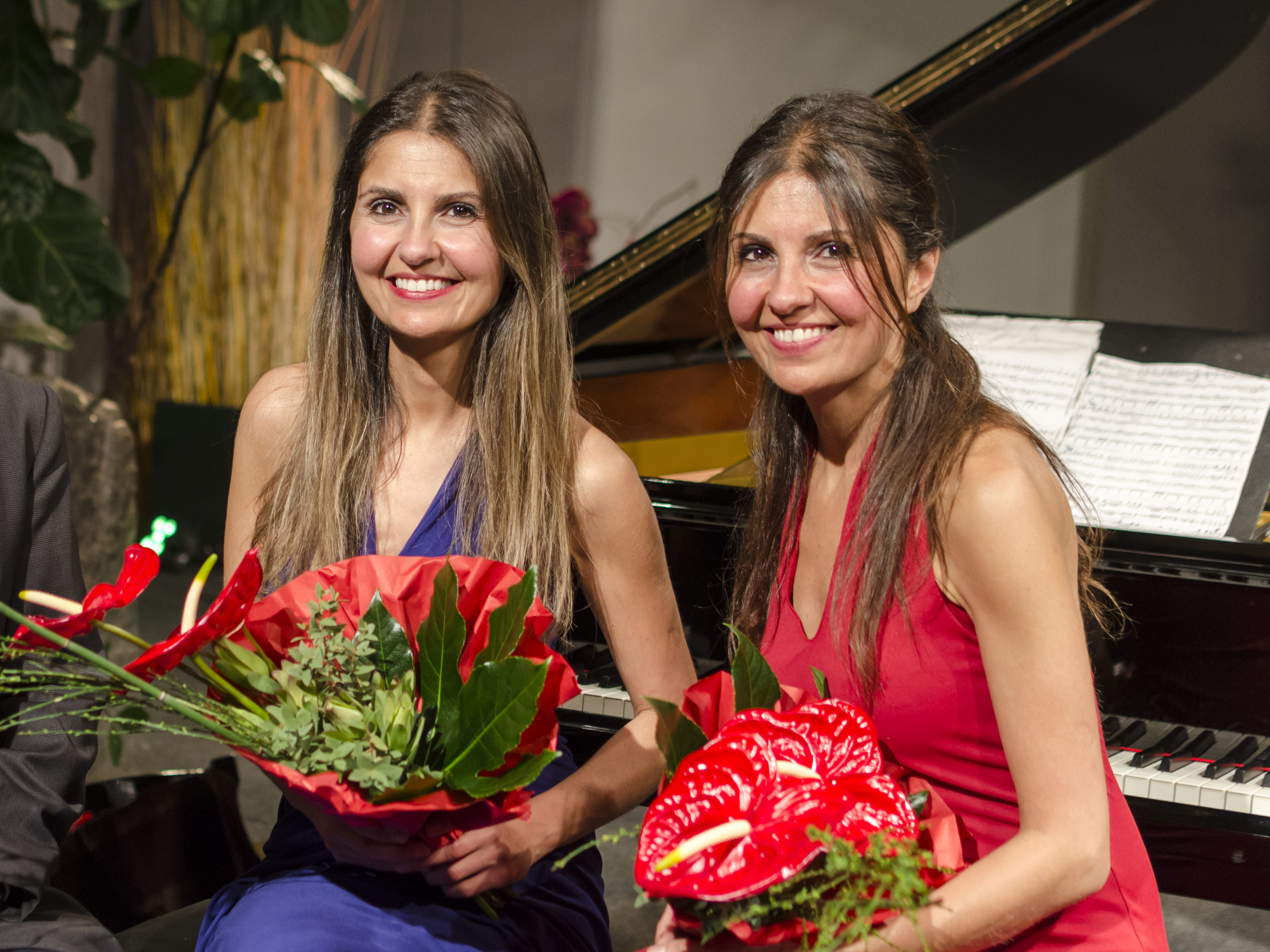
Ferzan and Ferhan Önder after a concert in Hainburg an der Donau, Austria, 2017.

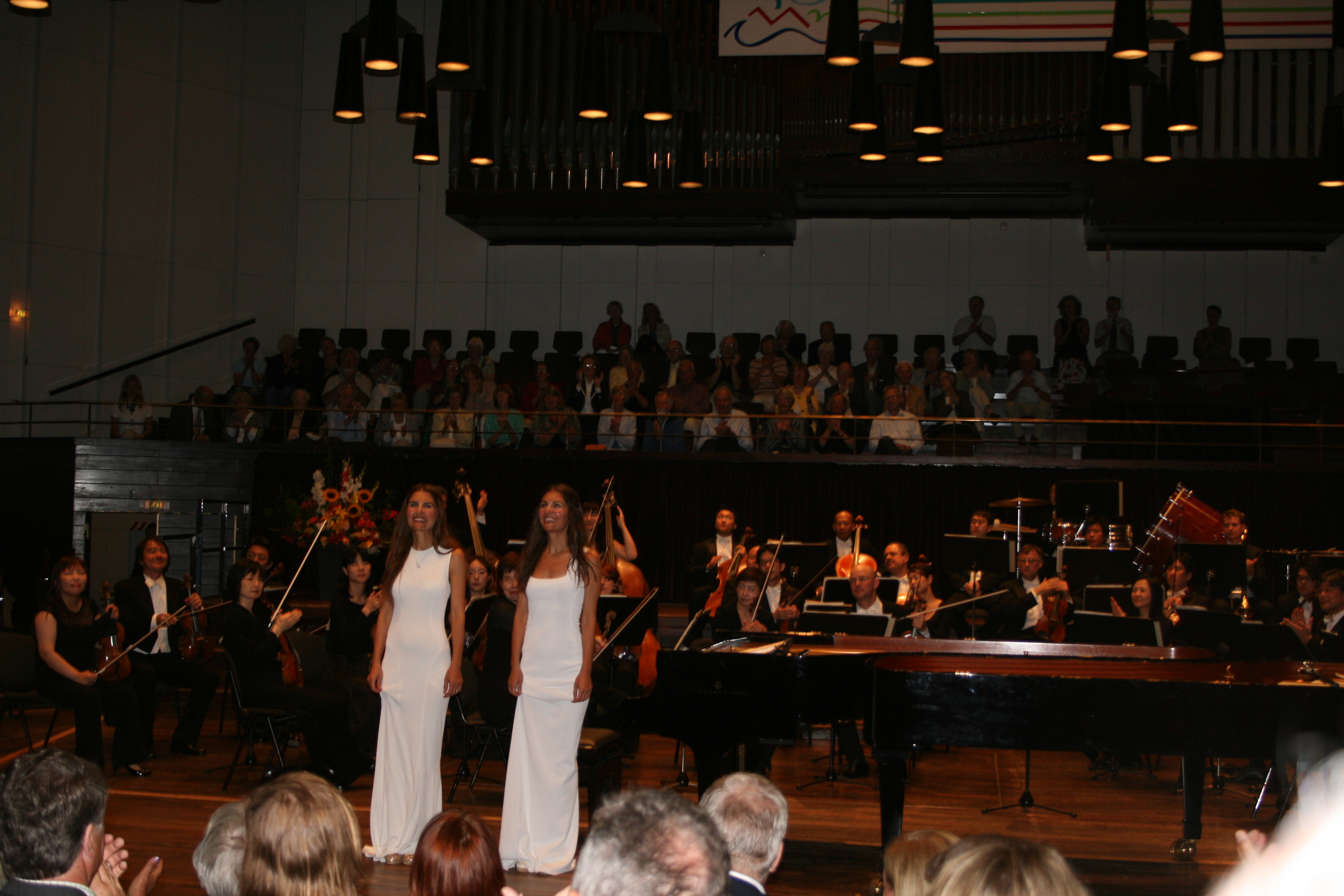
Önder Sisters at Schleswig-Holstein Musik Festival 2011 after a concert in Kiel, Germany.

The twin sisters Ferhan & Ferzan Önder (born 2 October 1965, in Tokat Province, Turkey) are Turkish-Austrian identical twin pianists who perform mostly as a piano duo.

== Biography ==
At the age of seven, they moved to Ankara to study in the State Conservatory. Already at the age of 14, they won a Jury Special Award at the Concorso Pianistico Internazionale Alessandro Casagrande in Terni, Italy.

Next, they won the "First Prize" at the International Piano Duo Competition in Hamburg, Germany. In 1985, after winning a competition, which led to a concert in Vienna, the twins decided to move to Austria, where they studied at the Academy of Music in Vienna with Noel Flores and Paul Badura-Skoda. In the academy, they also met Alfons Kontarsky, who became their mentor and a close friend until his death.

The duo is known through concert tours all over the world and regular performances with renowned international orchestras. They also perform at music festivals such as the Salzburg Festival, Beethovenfest Bonn, Vienna Festival, Rheingau Musik Festival and Schleswig-Holstein Musik Festival.

The duo's repertoire includes works by Bach, Vivaldi, Mozart, Poulenc, Bartók, Stravinsky, Lutosławski and Fazıl Say.

The twin sisters produced a number of CDs. Their CD Vivaldi Reflections, which had been released under the label EMI Records in 2001, won the "Echo Klassik Prize" of the German Phono Academy. Their next CD was 1001 Nights (EMI, 2003) with adaptations of Rimsky-Korsakov, Borodin, Balakirev and Mozart.

In 2003, they were appointed UNICEF goodwill ambassadors.

=== Private ===
- Ferhan Önder was married to the pianist Rico Gulda and they have a daughter.
- Ferzan Önder, initially the wife of a Viennese entrepreneur, is married to the multi-percussionist Martin Grubinger since 2009 and they have a son.

== Discography ==
- 1998: Saint-Saens - Beethoven (Pan Classics)
- 2001: Vivaldi Reflections (EMI)
- 2002: Karneval der Tiere
- 2003: 1001 Nights (EMI)
- 2015: Carmina Burana (SONY)
- 2019: Karneval der Tiere (SONY)
- 2019: Ferhan&Ferzan Önder play Fazil Say (WINTER&WINTER)

== See also ==
- Pekinel Sisters
