= Annette Morreau =

Music administrator (1946–2025)

- Born: 4 February 1946; Bucklow, Cheshire
- Died: 22 December 2025 (aged 79); Kilburn, London
- Resting place: Golders Green Crematorium
- Education: Dartington Hall School
- Alma mater: Durham University; Jacobs School of Music
- Occupations: Arts administrator, music broadcaster and critic
- Writing career
- Genre: 20th-century classical music
- Notable work: Biography of Emanuel Feuermann

Annette Scawen Morreau (4 February 1946 – 22 December 2025) was a British music writer, broadcaster and arts administrator who worked to champion live contemporary music and musicians in the UK. She set up the Contemporary Music Network in 1970, an Arts Council scheme to bring avant-garde music to a variety of venues across the UK, as an alternative to an otherwise London-dominated scene. She wrote the biography of Emanuel Feuermann in 2002.

== Early life ==
Annette Morreau was born in February 1946 in Bucklow, Cheshire, the second daughter of René Leopold Morreau, a shipping merchant and businessman who opened one of the UK's first launderettes, and Beryl Scawen Blunt. Her mother, to whom she was particularly close, was a well-known player of the violin and viola, and was part of the all female Macnaghten String Quartet, who were known for performing from memory. Her older sister, Jill, was married to Joseph Rouleau, the French Canadian operatic bass singer.

She went to school at Dartington Hall School, where she studied the cello, and in 1965 was accepted to Durham University to read music under Arthur Hutchings, who was a noted composer of Anglican church music. She later recalled arriving for her placement interview and being in awe of the beauty of the ancient city of Durham, England, and asked Hutchings to guide her around the cathedral and castle rather than give her a university place. Hutchings provided both the tour and a university place.

In her second year at Durham, in 1966, she became the first woman to win the Durham / Indiana University Scholarship to study music at the Jacobs School of Music in Bloomington, Indiana. There she studied cello under Janos Starker, but by all accounts this was not a success, with Morreau describing the experience as "alarming". Morreau realised she was not cut out to be a cello soloist, and decided to focus on the study of music rather than personal performance. After graduation from Durham she worked briefly for BBC Radio, before taking a job in the music department of the government agency for the promotion of culture, the Arts Council of Great Britain.

== Contemporary Music Network ==
Morreau's first major project for the Arts Council ended up as a seventeen year assignment. In 1970 Morreau wrote a report for the Council pointing out that much of the UK was seeing little or no access to contemporary live music, but that musicians still needed to rehearse and practice their skills, which was not a cost-free process. Morreau's argument was that the Arts Council could subsidise some of the cost of the artists' rehearsals and expenses, with local promoters paying for venues and other touring costs. The musicians would then perform outside London, thereby creating a cost-effective way of expanding access and supporting contemporary music, rather than directly funding a set of musicians to tour regional Britain. The Contemporary Music Network presented its first programme of work in 1972 and continues to the present day, in the form of Sight and Sound, a charitable agency.

The music in scope for the network was broadly, if imprecisely, defined. It would include jazz, work of more well-known composers such as Peter Maxwell-Davies, string quartets offering a programme of recently written classical work, new choral compositions, contemporary opera, more experimental music and occasionally dance-led productions. The venues that were chosen for the Network included Carlisle Cathedral, Blackburn Art Gallery, the Lobster Pot pub in Instow, North Devon (now called the Boathouse), and Teesside Polytechnic. The performers could be well known, such as the London Sinfonietta, Kronos Quartet or the relatively new Jane Manning. Dr. Manning, a soprano who particularly favoured contemporary work, made at least 10 appearances on the network, which contributed to the development of her reputation.

Though the Contemporary Music Network did not develop a brand for its work, Morreau early on forged a connection with Bob Linney, whose series of over 70 colourful posters became a feature of the Network's schedule. Morreau felt that promoting contemporary music would include moving away from a basic text based poster to something more eye-catching.

== Career as a broadcaster and writer ==
After leaving the Arts Council in 1987 Morreau took on a variety of music-related roles in broadcasting, newspapers and magazines, becoming a freelancer. Morreau wrote music reviews for The Independent, The Guardian and music magazines. Her reviews were sometimes trenchant. Writing for the BBC Music Magazine she offered this assessment of a recording of Alan Hovhaness' Symphonies No. 22 (City of Light) and No. 50 (Mount St Helens): "Both works are marshmallows, gluttonously kitsch and laboriously serious. Hovhaness’s musical style is an eclectic soup of Hollywood/Western and Hollywood/Oriental with a dash of Renaissance modalism thrown in."

She presented radio programmes on BBC Radio 3 and the BBC World Service. In 1991 she produced a series of six television programmes on BBC Two called "Not Mozart" where contemporary artists presented tributes to the composer. Michael Nyman's version portrayed Mozart as a woman, and was performed by Ute Lemper.

In 2003 Morreau wrote an article in the New Statesman, where she argued the case for female composers. She noted how the 2003 Proms season had just five female composers out of 36 on the programme, which was at least an improvement on the 2001 season with three female composers out of 28. Her view was: "The problem for female composers seems to be not one of talent, but of access. Lack of access breeds lack of confidence." She suggested that having a woman as BBC Controller of Music, who is effectively in charge of the Proms, could improve that access. This did not happen in her lifetime, all of BBC's Music Controllers have been men.

== Biography of Feuermann ==
In 2002 Morreau published her biography of Emanuel Feuermann, who has been described as the world's greatest cellist. He died in 1942 at the age of 39. She wrote the biography after winning a scholarship from Harvard University, with the help of his widow and other friends and relatives. During the research stage Morreau discovered that she was distantly related to Feuermann. Her interest started when she was given some newly re-recorded compact discs of Feuermann to review, and was struck by the quality of his workmanship. She presented some radio programmes about the musician, one of which was heard by a commissioning editor for Yale University Press, who invited her to write the biography.

During Morreau's research for the book, which she dedicated to her mother, she came to dislike Feuermann's personality, while maintaining a high regard for his work. The New Yorker's review of her book, which described Morreau's biography as "exemplary", noted how the cellist's "artistry, careerism, and naïveté crowded out any glimmer of self-doubt". The Times Literary Supplement, in a review that was nearly 2,000 words long, was less impressed, suggesting that while the book showed great diligence, Morreau was too tentative in her presentation, "as if she were overwhelmed by the man and his talent." Morreau wrote the encyclopedia entry for Feuermann in the New Grove Dictionary.

== Promoting musicians ==
Morreau had an admiration of the avante-garde composer-pianist Frederic Rzewski. When Rzewski approached his 80th birthday, Morreau, in conjunction with the Wigmore Hall, London, commissioned Rzewski to write an hour-long composition in five movements, called Ages, which was, at least in part, a reflection of the stages of his own life. This piece had a world première at the Wigmore Hall in April 2018, performed by Igor Levit.

Another musician whose work Morreau promoted was the American pianist William Kapell, who like Feuermann, died at a young age. In Kapell's case he was one of the victims of the BCPA Flight 304 aircrash on the approach to San Francisco Airport in October 1953, when he was 31 years old. Morreau presented a series of programmes for BBC Radio 3, called Vintage Years, which profiled a pianist that Morreau felt was a world class virtuoso who deserved better recognition.

== Death ==
Annette Morreau died in December 2025, aged 79 years, at her home in Kilburn, London.
