= Armenian Rhapsody =

Armenian Rhapsody is the title of various works:

== Musical compositions ==
- Armenian Rhapsody on National Themes (1895), Op. 48, piece for orchestra by Mikhail Ippolitov-Ivanov
- Armenian Rhapsody (1944), orchestral suite by Sergey Balasanian
- Armenian Rhapsody (1950), piece for two pianos by Arno Babajanian and Alexander Arutiunian
- Armenian Rhapsody for Guitar and Symphonic Wind Ensemble (2007) by Loris Chobanian

By Alan Hovhaness

- Armenian Rhapsody No. 1 (1944), Op. 45, piece for percussion and strings
- Armenian Rhapsody No. 2 (1944), Op. 51, piece for strings
- Armenian Rhapsody No. 3 (1944), Op. 189, piece for strings

== Other ==
- "Armenian Rhapsody", episode 14 of The Real Housewives of Orange County season 12
