= Beryl Scawen Blunt =

English violist (1911–1987)

- Born: Beryl Scawen Blunt; 27 November 1911; Canterbury, Kent, England
- Died: 23 September 1987 (aged 75) Chislehurst, England
- Genres: Classical
- Occupation: Musician
- Instrument: Viola
- Formerly of: Macnaghten String Quartet

Beryl Scawen Blunt (27 November 1911 – 23 September 1987) was a British violist. She played with the Macnaghten String Quartet, which premiered numerous English works at the Macnaghten-Lemare Concerts in the 1930s.

== Early life ==
Beryl Scawen Blunt was born in Canterbury on 27 November 1911. Her father, Arthur Scawen Blunt was a Bank Manager in Canterbury. Her mother Ada Hudson was the granddaughter of the naturalist Charles Thomas Hudson. She was a descendant of Samuel Blunt and Winifred Scawen, the great-grandparents of the poet Wilfred Scawen Blunt. She was married to René Leopold Morreau, a shipping merchant.

== Career ==
Her early study on the violin was with Janet Winifred Ingram, a violinist from Newport. In 1926 Blunt received her Intermediate Certificate of the Royal Schools of Music on violin, from Lord Northbourne at a ceremony in Canterbury. At the time, she was living in Bailey House, Canterbury. She was an exhibitioner at the Royal College of Music in London, where she studied viola, receiving her associate teaching diploma (ARCM teaching) in 1930 and her performance diploma (ARCM Performance) in 1933. She later studied viola with Lionel Tertis.

Whilst at the RCM she won the Cobbett Prize for chamber music with a performance of Lillian Harris' Phantasy Trio and the first performance anywhere of Benjamin Britten's Phantasy Quintet. The first public performance of Britten's Phantasy Quintet in F minor was given at a lunchtime concert on 12 December 1932 at the church of All Hallows-by-the-Tower, Barking, London, by the Macnaghten String Quartet: Anne Macnaghten (violin 1), Elise Desprez (violin 2), Beryl Scawen Blunt (viola), Mary Goodchild (cello), with Nora Wilson (viola). Later the same day the work was included in the third Macnaghten-Lemare concert at the Ballet Club (Mercury Theatre), 2 Ladbroke Road, London.

In May 1933, Blunt led the violas in the orchestral concert to mark the 50th Anniversary of the Royal College of Music. Geoffrey Toye conducted the orchestra, and in attendance were the patrons of the RCM, King George V and Queen Mary. Amongst Blunt's colleagues in the orchestra were Iris Lemare on Timpani and Evelyn Rothwell on Oboe.

From 1932, along with Iris Lemare, Elisabeth Lutyens and Anne Macnaghten, Blunt performed in a series of concerts showcasing British composers. She performed as part of the Macnaghten Quartet, with Elise Deprez on second violin and Mary Goodchild on cello. They performed forty new works in these Macnaghten-Lemare Concerts which featured music written by composers such as Britten, Christian Darnton, Gerald Finzi, Luytens, Elizabeth Maconchy, Frederick May, Alan Rawsthorne, John Sykes and Michael Tippett. These concerts provided relatively unknown composers with a platform to showcase their works, and gave opportunities to young musicians. The quartet gave the first performances of Dorothy Gow's Fantasy String Quartet in October 1932, Elizabeth Maconchy's The Woodspurge and Elisabeth Lutyens's The night is darkening in November 1932, Elizabeth Maconchy's String Quartet (1933) in November 1933, Benjamin Britten's Alla quartetto serioso: ‘Go play, boy, play’ in December 1933, Alan Rawsthorne's String Quartet no.1 (1932) in 1934, Dorothy Gow's, Three Songs for Tenor and String Quartet in January 1934 with Steuart Wilson (tenor), Frederick May's, Four Romantic Songs for Tenor, String Quartet and Piano (Helen Perkin – piano), also in January 1934, and Dorothy Gow's String Quartet in One Movement in December 1934.

The quartet were renowned for performing in concerts from memory. In a concert at the Aeolian Hall (London) in 1935 the Evening News music critic William McNaught commented: The four capable women players who form the Macnaghten Quartet played the whole programme without a note of music before them. The only people who have been known to do such a thing of late have been the famous Kolisch Quartet (of males) from Vienna.

When the Lemare concerts came to an end in 1937, and with Blunt's marriage to Morreau in 1936, her quartet-playing career took a step back and her teaching career started. She taught at the Kent Rural Music School and as a peripatetic teacher in Kent, teaching the violist Garfield Jackson who inherited her viola which he played with the Endellion Quartet. She also played with the Bromley Symphony Orchestra.

== Death and personal life ==
Beryl Scawen Blunt Morreau died in Chislehurst, Kent on 23 September 1987.

She had two children. Her first daughter Jill Renee Morreau (b.1942) was married to the Canadian bass opera singer, Joseph Rouleau and her second daughter, Annette Morreau studied the cello with Janos Starker and wrote a biography of the cellist Emanuel Feuermann.
