= Symphony No. 66 (Hovhaness) =

1992 symphony by Alan Hovhaness

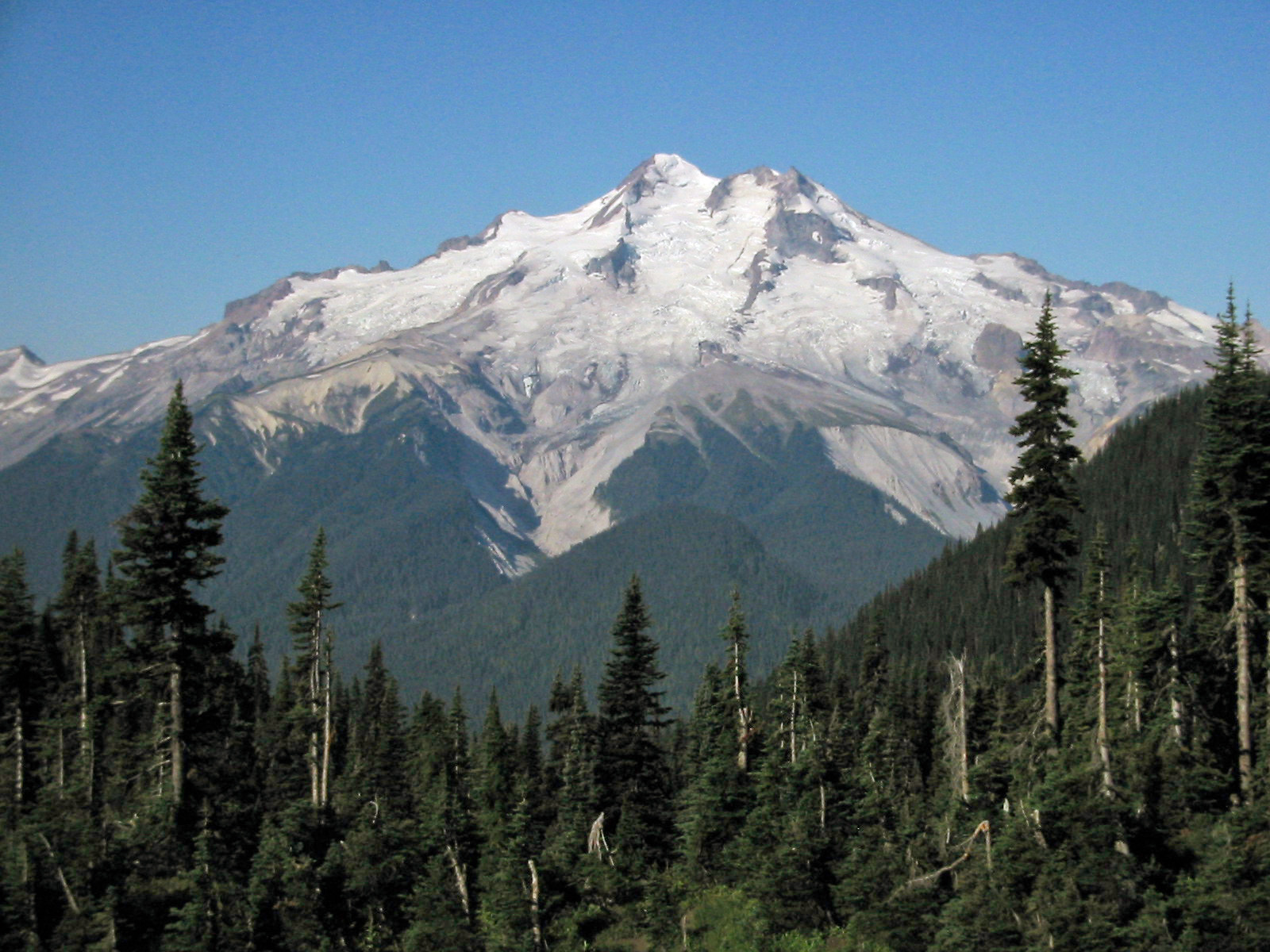
The symphony was inspired by the stratovolcano Glacier Peak in the State of Washington.

The Symphony No. 66, Op. 428, Hymn to Glacier Peak is an orchestral composition in three movements and the penultimate symphony by the American composer Alan Hovhaness. The work was commissioned by the Seattle Youth Symphony Orchestra and was completed in 1992, shortly before its premiere by the Seattle Youth Symphony, conducted by Ruben Gurevich, at the Seattle Opera House on May 10, 1992. The title of the work comes from the stratovolcano Glacier Peak in the Cascade Range, visible from Hovhaness's home in Seattle, Washington.

== Composition ==
A performance of the piece lasts approximately 19 minutes. The symphony is composed in three movements:

1. Andante maestoso
2. Andante espressivo, "Love song to Hinako"
3. Largo maestoso, "Prelude and Fugue"

The second movement is dedicated to Hovhaness's wife Hinako Fujihara.

== Reception ==
Andrew Farach-Colton of Gramophone praised the piece, writing, "As the title suggests, it has a preponderance of hymn-like melody, yet there’s a valedictory quality to the music that I find touching. The finale is particularly effective, moving from hymn to one of Hovhaness’s most tuneful fugues via a darkly atmospheric interlude." Mark Swed of the Los Angeles Times also lauded the work, further commenting, "Enthralled with mystical Asia, Bach and mountains, Alan Hovhaness is often accused of writing formulaic, long-lined and heady counterpoint that predictably resolves into spiritually grandiose cadences. But if his music is all of a mold, in the best of it the lingering melodies are gorgeous; the fugues, fabulously opulent; the finales, downright mood-elevating."

On the other hand, Anthony Burton of BBC Music Magazine was more critical of the symphony, writing of it and other late-period Hovhaness works, remarking:

When it was new in 1955, Hovhaness’s Second Symphony, Mysterious Mountain, must have seemed remarkably fresh in its simplicity and serenity. But the prolific Armenian-American composer was to draw from this well many times, and his characteristic modal hymns, irregular metres, oriental-sounding melodies, static ostinatos and rough-hewn fugues occur equally in the last but one of his 67 symphonies, Hymn to Glacier Peak, and, with the addition of some filmic depiction of the eruption of Mount St. Helens, in No. 50.

Another music critic similarly opined that Hymn to Glacier Peak "fades only by comparison" to Hovhaness's other work, adding, "if it were the only work he ever wrote, we would revere it as a masterpiece."

Reviewing the premiere performance, Paul Schiavo remarked on the symphony's "radically conservative style". While agreeing that it may please some listeners, "it offers no experience with the rhythms, melodic contours and textures of modern music. Young players ought to be familiar with these, but Hovhaness' symphony spared the Youth Symphony any encounter with them."

== See also ==
- List of compositions by Alan Hovhaness
