= Peter Klatzow =

South African composer (1945–2021)

- Born: Peter James Leonard Klatzow; 14 July 1945; Springs, Transvaal, South Africa
- Died: 29 December 2021 (aged 76) Cape Town, South Africa
- Occupation: Composer
- Instrument: Piano
- Website: users.skynet.be/sky42414/klatzow/Pages/homepage.html

Peter James Leonard Klatzow (14 July 1945 – 29 December 2021) was a South African composer and pianist.

He was the director of the College of Music and was an emeritus professor in composition at the University of Cape Town.

== Life and career ==
Klatzow's earliest musical training (at about age five years) was at the Roman Catholic convent of Saint Imelda in Brakpan.

After completing his schooling at St. Martin's School, Rosettenville, Johannesburg he briefly taught music and Afrikaans at the Waterford Kamhlaba School in Swaziland.

Klatzow moved to London in 1964 to study for a year at the Royal College of Music after being awarded a composition scholarship from the South African Music Rights Organisation composition scholarship which allowed him to go to the (RCM) in London to study. His professors included Gordon Jacob (orchestration), Kathleen Long (piano), and Bernard Stevens (composition). He won several prizes for composition while at the school. He later studied in Italy and then with Nadia Boulanger in Paris.

He returned to South Africa in 1966, where he worked for the SABC in Johannesburg as a music producer. In 1973 he was appointed to the South African College of Music in Cape Town where he later became professor in composition and director.

Klatzow died in Cape Town on 29 December 2021, at the age of 76, from COVID-19.

== Works ==
Klatzow has composed choral works, including liturgical pieces, orchestral works, and ballet music.

=== Music ===
- Still-life with Moonbeams (1974) Symphonic Poem
- Dances of Earth and Fire: Marimba Solo (1988)
- Chamber concerto for 7 (1979)
- Inyanga: marimba solo (2007)
- Hamlet: The Ballet (1991)
- Ach, Bach: for Organ (1987)
- Six Concert Etudes for Marimba
- Music for 3 Paintings by Irma Stern
- Mass
- Two Songs from the /Xam
- Sonata for cello and piano
- Magnificat and Nunc Dimittis

=== Recordings ===
- Fantasy on Japanese Woodprints, Op. 211 (1990) (Alan Hovhaness, Peter Klatzow, Frank Nuyts)
- A Programme of Piano Music from South Africa (Arnold Van Wyk, Peter Klatzow, Roelof Temmingh, David Kosviner, Jill Richards)
- Towards the light – a selection of choral works recorded in Oxford by the Commotio choir, under the direction of Matthew Berry.

=== Books ===
- Composers in South Africa Today. Oxford University Press. 1987. ISBN 978-0-19-570431-0.

== Awards ==
- Joint winner of the 1977 International Composers' Competition
- Twice winner of the Helgard Steyn award: in 1994 for From the Poets and again in 2014 for Lightscapes
- Doctor of Music awarded by UCT in 1999
- Huberte Rupert Music Prize by the Academy of Science of South Africa for his lifetime work in 2011
