= Symphony No. 63 (Hovhaness) =

1988 symphony by Alan Hovhaness

The Symphony No. 63, Op. 411, Loon Lake is a symphony for orchestra in two movements by the American composer Alan Hovhaness. The work was commissioned in September 1987 by the New Hampshire Music Festival and the Loon Preservation Society. It was completed in early 1988 and premiered August 18, 1988, with conductor Thomas Nee leading the New Hampshire Music Festival Orchestra. The ending of the piece was later revised by Hovhaness at the request of his wife; the revised symphony premiered July 2, 1991, and is the only version available on recording.

== Composition ==
=== Structure ===
Loon Lake has a duration of roughly 26 minutes and is composed in two movements:

1. Prelude: Largo solenne, andante pastorale
2. Andante misterioso, maestoso, presto, allegro

=== Instrumentation ===
The symphony is scored for a small orchestra comprising piccolo, flute, oboe, English horn, two clarinets, two bassoons, two French horns, two trumpets, trombone, percussionist on timpani and chimes, harp, and strings.

== Reception ==
William Yeoman of Gramophone praised Loon Lake, writing, "Here, songs both avian and pastoral for a multitude of wind soloists punctuate a luminous, if occasionally overcast, orchestral skyscape." The music critic David Hurwitz was more critical, however, remarking:

With only two movements, it’s as long as the concerto (about 26 minutes). Most of the time is taken up by the second movement, a sort of rondo in which arabesques for woodwinds flecked by Hovhaness' characteristic bell sounds alternate with a model hymn straight out of Vaughan Williams' Tallis Fantasia. Eventually, these two elements begin to intermingle, but it takes an awfully long time, and each listener will have to decide if the music overstays its welcome. Of course, Hovhaness has an intensely characteristic style, but the devil is in the details: in the balance of elements and sense of timing. Fine as the performances are, it’s hard to make the case that these works find Hovhaness at his best.

== See also ==
- List of compositions by Alan Hovhaness
