= Op. 132 =

In music, Op. 132 stands for Opus number 132. Compositions that are assigned this number include:

- Beethoven – String Quartet No. 15
- Hovhaness – Symphony No. 2
- Prokofiev – Cello Concertino
- Reger – Variations and Fugue on a Theme by Mozart
- Schumann – Märchenerzählungen
