= Op. 325 =

In music, Op. 325 stands for Opus number 325. Compositions that are assigned this number include:

- Hovhaness – Guitar Concerto No. 1
- Johann Strauss II – Tales from the Vienna Woods
