= Leo Lewis =

Leo Lewis may refer to:

- Leo Lewis (running back) (1933–2013), American football running back in the CFL
- Leo Lewis (wide receiver) (born 1956), American football wide receiver in the NFL and CFL
- Leo Rich Lewis (1865–1945), American composer

== See also ==
- Leonard Lewis, British producer and director
- Leopold David Lewis, English dramatist
