= Symphony No. 22 (Hovhaness) =

1970 symphony by Alan Hovhaness

The Symphony No. 22, Op. 236, City of Light is a four-movement symphony for orchestra by the American composer Alan Hovhaness. The work was commissioned by the Birmingham Symphony Orchestra for the centennial of Birmingham, Alabama and was completed in 1970. The work has been recorded multiple times and remains one of Hovhaness's more popular compositions.

== Composition ==
City of Light has a duration of approximately thirty minutes and is composed in four movements:

1. Allegro moderato
2. Angel of Light (Largo)
3. Allegretto grazioso
4. Finale (Largo maestoso)

Though the symphony was composed for the city of Birmingham, Alabama, the city referred to in the title is one of Hovhaness's invention; Hovhaness described, "I was thinking of a million lights, an imaginary city..." He described the second movement "Angel of Light" as "a memory of a childhood vision I had... I was always affected by Christmas." The third movement "Allegretto grazioso" is based on a dance melody Hovhaness originally wrote in high school for an operetta Lotus Blossom.

== Reception ==
Mark Swed of the Los Angeles Times lauded the work, opining, "Enthralled with mystical Asia, Bach and mountains, Alan Hovhaness is often accused of writing formulaic, long-lined and heady counterpoint that predictably resolves into spiritually grandiose cadences. But if his music is all of a mold, in the best of it the lingering melodies are gorgeous; the fugues, fabulously opulent; the finales, downright mood-elevating." Andrew Farach-Colton of Gramophone gave the symphony a more mixed response, writing, "...City of Light (1970) has some lovely ideas, like the surprisingly sweet and simple string melody in the middle of the 'Angel of Light' movement (beginning at 1'30"), and the third movement, Allegretto grazioso, which sounds like a minuet in oriental garb. The outer movements, however, outstay their welcome." Conversely, Annette Morreau of BBC Music Magazine criticized the work, in addition to Hovhaness's Symphony No. 50, Mount St. Helens, commenting, "Both works are marshmallows, gluttonously kitsch and laboriously serious. Hovhaness’s musical style is an eclectic soup of Hollywood/Western and Hollywood/Oriental with a dash of Renaissance modalism thrown in."

== See also ==
- List of compositions by Alan Hovhaness
