= Lousadzak =

1944 concerto by Alan Hovhaness

Lousadzak (The Coming of Light), Op. 48, is a 1944 concerto for piano and string orchestra by the American-Armenian composer Alan Hovhaness. Duration of the piece is about 18 minutes. The work is known for its use of aleatory that is said to have impressed fellow composers Lou Harrison and John Cage, and anticipated "many soon-to-be-hip" aleatory techniques.

== History ==
Shortly before composing Lousadzak, Alan Hovhaness had received a severe reprimand from Aaron Copland and, as a result, destroyed a thousand earlier pieces before making a fresh start. While being a student under Fredrick Converse at the New England Conservatory, Hovhaness had already familiarized with Indian classical music and, later on, embraced music from different cultures such as Korean, Japanese, and Chinese music.

== Aleatory ==
The aleatoric technique used in the piece is what Hovhaness called a “humming effect.” It occurs several times throughout the piece in the string section. The string players are instructed to play several pre-composed motives at a free tempo throughout various measures to achieve the effect. The aleatory nature of the technique was also controversial. In Arnold Rosner and Vance Wolverton’s writing on the piece: “… is hardly aleatory, since exact pitches are carefully controlled and any two performances will be substantially the same.”

Lousadzak was Hovhaness's first work to make use of an innovative technique he called "spirit murmur," an early example of aleatoric music inspired by a vision of his close friend, the mystic painter Hermon di Giovanno. The technique involves instruments repeating phrases in uncoordinated fashion, producing a complex "cloud" or "carpet" of sounds. In an early program note for Lousadzak, Hovhaness described this and similar passages as "[suggesting] the potential sounds out of which melodies are born."

== Reception ==
Andrew Farach-Colton of Gramophone lauded Lousadzak, saying, "the music has a spare sensuality that’s [...] delectable." The work was also praised by BBC Music Magazine's Anthony Burton for its "Eastern emphasis on ornamented melody over a drone bass, and its almost complete absence of conventional harmony." On the other hand, John R. White, writing in the mid-1960s before the wider usage of minimalist and aleatoric devices in American art music, singled out the work's aleatory passages as a particular weakness, observing that even though the "delicious humming effect" they produce "may delight an audience that has never before seen an orchestra turned loose on chance music", such basic assumptions mean that "this easily playable work sounds static and after a while simply has to cease on a shimmering sound."

== Recordings ==
Lousadzak has been recorded by Maro Ajemian and Keith Jarrett.

== See also ==
- List of compositions by Alan Hovhaness
