= Op. 411 =

In music, Op. 411 stands for Opus number 411. Compositions that are assigned this number include:

- Hovhaness – Symphony No. 63
- Strauss – Lagunen-Walzer
