= Hermon di Giovanno =

Greek-American painter (1897 - 1969)

Hermon di Giovanno (born Hermolaus Ionides, Greek: Ερμόλαος Ιωνίδης; 17 December 1897 – April 1969) was an American mystic painter.

He was born in Mytilene, Lesbos Island, Ottoman Empire (now Greece), but lived for most of his life in Boston, Massachusetts. In early adulthood, he performed as an operatic tenor, but was eventually forced to abandon his singing career after suffering difficulties with his voice. He had changed his name (from his original name, Hermolaus Ionides) to an Italian one because he had been advised that it would assist him with his opera career. According to his close friend, the composer Alan Hovhaness, "...he wanted to be an opera singer when he was young. Some local conductor said he should have an Italian name, so he had this peculiar name that didn't have anything to do with him, but is a translation."

In Boston, while working at the counter of a Boston-area Hayes-Bickford's (a cafeteria-style restaurant), he befriended Alan Hovhaness and the painter Hyman Bloom, who often ate dinner there. Beginning around the early 1940s, the three often met to listen to Indian classical music and discuss various mystical subjects. Also a member of this circle was Dr. Elizabeth A. Gregory, a Boston pediatrician to whom di Giovanno gave a number of his paintings just before his final return to Greece. Gregory donated these paintings to Bates College in Lewiston, Maine.

It was not until he was in his forties that di Giovanno began painting. Although he first began modestly, drawing on paper in black and white, eventually Hyman Bloom encouraged him to work in color, supplying him with a box of colored pastels. Di Giovanno believed his artworks to be directly inspired by otherworldly supernatural forces.

Hovhaness often referred to di Giovanno as his "spiritual guide" and "psychic teacher," and stated that he was often referred to as "the Socrates of Boston." Hovhaness believed that di Giovanno provided the "spiritual forces" required to allow him to compose his Easter Cantata (1953), and his Symphony No. 6, "Celestial Gate" (1959) is named after an artwork by di Giovanno. Hovhaness's Symphony No. 9, "St. Vartan" (1950), while not originally dedicated to di Giovanno, was later dedicated to him (possibly at the time of the symphony's recording, after di Giovanno's death).

Di Giovanno exerted an influence on the American painter David Barbero (1938–1999), who met di Giovanno in 1957, and was also a mentor to the artist Paul Shapiro and the musician Gil Magno.

Di Giovanno's great-nephew, the Athens, Georgia singer-songwriter Peter Alvanos, counts him as one of his primary inspirations, and named his band, Fabulous Bird, after one of di Giovanno's paintings. The Fort Smith, Arkansas punk rock band, Giovanno, uses his surname as his artwork has inspired their early lyrics.
