= Symphony No. 60 (Hovhaness) =

1985 symphony by Alan Hovhaness

The Symphony No. 60, Op. 396, To the Appalachian Mountains is a symphony for orchestra in four movements written by the American composer Alan Hovhaness. The work was commissioned August 6, 1985 by Martin Marietta Energy Systems, Inc. for "Homecoming '86", an event celebrating the cultural heritage of Tennessee. It was composed in November and December 1985 and commemorates the geography and heritage of the Appalachian Mountains region.

== Composition ==
A performance of the symphony lasts approximately 33 minutes. It is composed in four movements:

1. Adagio doloroso
2. Allegro
3. Senza misura: Adagio
4. Finale: Andante – Allegro

The third movement quotes passages from the traditional song "Parting Friends". On composing To the Appalachian Mountains, Hovhaness wrote in the program notes:

The music was composed during November and December of 1985. While composing this symphony I studied many Appalachian songs, but did not quote any of the melodies except in the third movement. However, I tried to put myself into the spirit and moods of the Appalachian idioms and culture, the spiritual life, the religious singing from shaped-notes under the oak trees, and the Appalachian ballads and their tales of love and death. I studied the structures of motives and scales in the Appalachian music and tried to create my own melodies within the boundaries of the modes which employ altered major scales and minor pentatonic (black-key) scales.

== Reception ==
The music critic Donald Rosenberg praised Hovhaness for his "mystical serenity and unabashed love for folk and nature-inflected material" and said of the symphony, "The writing is tonal and richly hued, imbued with a grandeur that emanates from another era." AllMusic wrote of the work, "Its general mood appears to reflect the smoky majesty of the Appalachians themselves and does not devolve into imitations of the music associated with that region (i.e., bluegrass and old-timey mountain music); although some lip service is paid to Native American cultures that once inhabited this region during the second movement Allegro."

== See also ==
- List of compositions by Alan Hovhaness
