= List of compositions by Alan Hovhaness =

This is a list of compositions by Alan Hovhaness (1911–2000), ordered by opus number. Composition dates shown in Roman font are as given at Hovhaness.com, while conflicting dates from Kunze or New Grove are shown in italics. Similarly, instrumentation shown in Roman font is as given at the Hovhaness.com website. Several place names and other names in composition titles are linked to disambiguation pages rather than to specific Wikipedia articles, because Hovhaness did not specify which "Wildcat Mountain", for instance, had been intended.

- Op. 1, No. 1: Oror [Lullaby] (violin and piano) (1922?; rev 1926)
- Op. 1, No. 2: Suite for violin and piano (1927)
- Op. 2, No. 1: Monadnock [Fantasy for orchestra] ([2222 4331, timpani, strings) (1936; 1935, rev. 1938 per Kunze; 1935, rev. 1936 per New Grove)
- Op. 2, No. 2: Storm on Mt. Wildcat (originally titled Boreas and Mt. Wildcat) [Fantasy for orchestra] (2222 4331, timpani, percussion, strings) (1931, rev. 1936; 1931 only, per Kunze)
- Op. 3: Trio No. 1 in E Minor (for violin, cello, piano) (1935)
- Op. 4: Missa Brevis (bass, SATB choir, strings, organ) (1936; 1935 per Kunze)
- Op. 5: Three Odes of Solomon (medium voice and piano) (1937; 1935 per Kunze)
- Op. 6, No. 1: Toccata and Fugue (piano solo) (Toccata 1969, Fugue 1935; 1935, Toccata rev. 1970 per New Grove)
- Op. 6, No. 2: Toccata and Fugue on a Kabardin Tune (piano solo) (1951)
- Op. 7: How I Adore Thee (medium voice and piano) (1936)
- Op. 8: String Quartet No. 1 [Jupiter] (1936)
- Op. 9: Piano Quintet No. 1 (1926, rev. 1962) (New Grove also assigns op. 9 to the first of Two Suites for piano, 1936)
- Op. 10: Three Preludes and Fugues (piano solo) (1935) [originally published as Op. 5]
- Op. 11: Sonata for violin and piano (1937)
- Op. 12: Sonata Ricercare (piano solo) (1935)
- Op. 13: Prelude and Fugue in A Minor (oboe (or flute) and bassoon) (1935, rev. 1959; rev. 1957 per Kunze)
- Op. 14: Tapor [Processional for band] (1948) (New Grove gives title Tapor No. 1, and also assigns op. 14 to the second of Two Suites for piano, 1936)
- Op. 15: Suite for band (1948) (New Grove says 1949, but also assigns op. 15 to a Fantasy for piano, 1936)
- Op. 16: Fantasy for piano (1952) (New Grove says 1953)
- Op. 17, No. 1: Cello Concerto (cello, orchestra [2222 4330, timpani, harp, strings]) (1937; 1936/70 per Kunze) [originally published as Op. 27]
- Op. 17, No. 2: Symphony No. 1 Exile Symphony (orchestra 2222 4331, timpani, harp, strings]) (1937; 1936/72 per Kunze)
- Op. 18: Variations and Fugue (orchestra [3322 4331, timpani, percussion, harp, glockenspiel, strings]) (1963; "or 1964" per New Grove)
- Op. 19: Angelic Song (cantata for soprano (or tenor), horn, strings) (1934/1947; later incorporated into Op. 425)
- Op. 20, No. 1: Nocturne (harp solo) (1937, rev. 1961)
- Op. 20, No. 2: Nocturne (flute and harp) (1956)
- Op. 20a: Lament (voice and piano) (1936) (Only New Grove includes this)
- Op. 20b: Lament (piano) (1937) (Only New Grove includes this)
- Op. 21: Suite in D Minor (English horn and bassoon) (1933)
- Op. 22: Mystic Flute (piano solo) (1937)
- Op. 23: Makiko Suite (oboe and bassoon) (1949)
- Op. 24, No. 1: Yar Nazani (The Lover Who Desired to Please) (voice and piano) (1938)
- Op. 24, No. 2: Vaspooragan (voice and piano) (1938)
- Op. 25: Lament (clarinet solo) (1935)
- Op. 26: Behold, God is My Help (SATB chorus and organ (or piano) (undated)
- Op. 27: O Lord God of Hosts (SATB choir, organ (or piano), and 2 trumpets, 2 trombones ad lib.) (undated; 1968 per Kunze)
- Op. 28: O Lord, Rebuke Me Not (SATB choir and organ (or piano)) (undated; 1968 per Kunze)
- Op. 29: Layla (medium voice and piano) (1935)
- Op. 30: Bagatelles ["4 Bagatelles for string quartet"] (1966)
- Op. 31: Two Shakespeare Sonnets (voice and piano) (1939; rev. 1942 per Kunze)
- Op. 32, No. 1: Starlight of Noon (voice and piano) (1947)
- Op. 32, No. 2: O World (bass voice (or tenor or baritone or trombone) and piano) (1960)
- Op. 33: Love Songs of Hafiz (medium voice and piano) (1936/67)
- Op. 34: Watchman, Tell Us of the Night ["Christmas Song"] (soprano and organ (or piano); or bass voice, SATB chorus, organ (or piano); or bass voice, SATB chorus, oboe, clarinet, strings) (1927, rev. 1962)
- Op. 35: The Lord's Prayer (SATB chorus and organ (or piano)) (1962)
- Op. 36: Two Ghazals (piano solo) (1933, rev. 1966; 1931 [in error]), rev. 1966 per Kunze
- Op. 37: Vijag (2 pianos) (1946)
- Op. 38: Mazert Nman Rehan (Thy Hair is Like Basil Leaf) (piano solo) (1944)
- Op. 39: Artinis (Urarduan: Sun God) (piano solo) (1945)
- Op. 40a: Psalm and Fugue (strings) (1940)
- Op. 40b: Alleluia and Fugue (strings) (1940)
- Op. 41: Protest and Prayer (tenor, TTBB chorus, organ (or piano)) (1967)
- Op. 42: I will Rejoice in the Lord (SATB chorus and organ (or piano) (undated)
- Op. 43: 12 Armenian Folk Songs (piano solo) (1943)
- Op. 44: Celestial Fantasy (strings) (1935/44)
- Op. 45: Armenian Rhapsody No. 1 (percussion and strings) (1944)
- Op. 46: Let Us Love One Another (SATB chorus, tenor (or baritone) ad lib., and organ (or piano)) (1941/62)
- Op. 47a: Varak (violin and piano) (1944)
- Op. 47b: Arshalouis [Arshalouis (Dawn)] (violin and piano) (1939–43)
- Op. 48: Lousadzak [Coming of Light/Dawn of Light] (concerto for piano and strings) (1944)
- Op. 49: Khrimian Hairig (trumpet and strings) (1944, rev. 1948)
- Op. 50: Elibris [God of Dawn of Urardu] (concerto for flute and strings) (1944)
- Op. 51: Armenian Rhapsody No. 2 (strings) (1944)
- Op. 52, No. 1: Lousnag Kisher [Moonlit Night] (piano solo) (1943)
- Op. 52, No. 2: Lullaby [aka Slumber Song] (piano solo) (1951; 1956 per Kunze)
- Op. 53, No. 1: Jesus, Lover of My Soul (voice, SATB chorus, organ (or piano)) (1922/35)
- Op. 53, No. 2: Tzaikerk [Evening Song] (flute, violin, drums, strings) (1945; 1944 per Kunze)
- Op. 54, No. 1: Invocations to Vahakn (piano and percussion) (1945)
- Op. 54, No. 2: Hakhpat (sonata for piano and percussion) (1946/51)
- Op. 55, No. 1: Vanadour [Armenian God of Hospitality] (piano solo) (1945)
- Op. 55, No. 2: Farewell to the Mountains (piano solo) (1946)
- Op. 56, No. 1: Chahagir [Torch-Bearer] (viola solo) (1944)
- Op. 56, No. 2: Yeraz [The Dream] (violin solo) (undated; 1946 per Kunze)
- Op. 56, No. 3: Hercules (soprano and violin) (1959)
- Op. 57, No. 1: Anahid: The Mother Goddess [Fantasy] (flute, English horn, trumpet, timpani, percussion, strings) (1944–45; 1944 per Kunze)
- Op. 57, No. 2: Vosdan (flute, trumpet, timpani, strings) (1945, rev. 1948)
- Op. 58: Sharagan and Fugue (brass choir) (1947)
- Op. 59: Is There Survival? [King Vahaken (ballet suite)] (0040 a sax 0400, timpani, 3 percussion) (1949)
- Op. 60: Mihr (2 pianos) (1945)
- Op. 61: Divertimento [Vahan] (oboe, clarinet, bassoon, horn (or 4 clarinets)) (1947)
- Op. 62: Etchmiadzin (opera for 4 sopranos and 3 baritones soli, 2 SA choruses, SABar chorus, orchestra [flute, English horn, trumpet, 2 Chinese drums, 4 Burmese gongs, sistrum of tiny bells, strings]) (1946)
- Op. 62b: Prayer of Saint Gregory [intermezzo from the opera Etchmiadzin] (trumpet and strings (or trumpet with band, piano, or organ, or organ solo)) (1946)
- Op. 63: Greek Rhapsody No. 1 (piano solo) (1944)
- Op. 64: Achtamar (piano solo) (1947; 1948 per Kunze)
- Op. 65: Avak the Healer (cantata for soprano, trumpet, strings) (1945–46)
- Op. 66, No. 1: Kohar (flute, English horn, timpani, strings) (1946)
- Op. 66, No. 2: Agori (flute, English horn, bassoon, trumpet, timpani, strings: concerto based on material from the opera Etchmiadzin, Op. 62) (1946)
- Op. 67: Saris (violin and piano) (1946)
- Op. 68: Sing Aloud (SATB chorus) (1951)
- Op. 69: Sanahin (partita for organ) (1951–66)
- Op. 70: Five Fantasies for brass choir (1967)
- Op. 71: Haroutiun [Resurrection] (trumpet and strings) (1948)
- Op. 71a: Haroutiun [Resurrection] (trumpet and piano) (1948)
- Op. 72: Canzona and Fugue (horn, 2 trumpets, trombone (or tuba) (1967)
- Op. 73, No. 1: Khirgiz Suite (violin and piano) (1951)
- Op. 73, No. 2: Shatakh [Çatak] (violin and piano) (1947)
- Op. 74, No. 1: Pagan Saint (voice and piano) (1947; 1948 per Kunze)
- Op. 74, No. 4: Lullaby of the Lake (voice and piano) (1947; 1948 per Kunze)
- Op. 74, No. 5: I Heard Thee Singing (voice and piano) (1947; undated by Kunze)
- Op. 74, No. 8: Raven River (low voice, piano, gong) (1947; undated by Kunze)
- Op. 75: Sosi – Forest of Prophetic Sounds (violin, piano, horn, timpani, giant tam-tam, strings) (1948)
- Op. 76: Thirtieth Ode of Solomon (cantata for baritone, SATB chorus, trumpet, trombone, strings) (1948)
- Op. 77: Zartik Parkim [Awake, My Glory] (concerto for piano and chamber orchestra [1010 2100, timpani, percussion, strings]) (1948)
- Op. 78: Artik (concerto for horn and strings) (1948)
- Op. 78a: Artik (horn and piano) (1948)
- Op. 79: Six Dances (horn, 2 trumpets, trombone, tuba) (1967)
- Op. 80: I have Seen the Lord (soprano, SATB chorus, trumpet, organ (or piano)) (1962)
- Op. 81: Janabar [Journey: 5 Hymns of Serenity] (trumpet, piano, violin solo, strings) (1949)
- Op. 82: Transfiguration (cantata for tenor and SATB chorus) (1956). Based on bible text Mark 9:2-9. Movements/numbers 13-16 of this work, based on Mark 9:9, was extracted and published by C. F. Peters as a separate work "And As They Came Down From The Mountain". Peters erroneously labels this extracted work as Opus 18.
- Op. 83: Hymn to Yerevan (for full band) (undated; 1969 per Kunze)
- Op. 84, No. 1: Black Pool of Cat (voice and piano) (1950)
- Op. 84, No. 2: Innisfallen (voice and piano) (1950)
- Op. 85: Fantasy on an Ossetin Tune (piano solo) (1951)
- Op. 86: Make Haste (motet for SATB chorus) (1951)
- Op. 87: Four Motets (for SATB chorus) (1951)
- Op. 88: Concerto No. 1 [Arevakal] (for orchestra [2222 2200, timpani, percussion, harp, strings]) (1951)
- Op. 89, No. 1: Concerto No. 2 (for violin and strings) (1951/57) [no further Nos. are mentioned]
- Op. 90, No. 1: Upon Enchanted Ground (flute, cello, harp, tam-tam) (1951) [no further Nos. are mentioned]
- Op. 91: Khaldis (concerto for 4 (or any multiple thereof) trumpets, piano, percussion) (1951; rev. 1954 per Kunze)
- Op. 92: Orbit No. 1 (flute, harp, celesta, tam-tam) (1952)
- Op. 93, No. 1: Tallinn (concerto for viola and strings) (1951–52; 1951 per Kunze)
- Op. 93, No. 2: I will Lift up Mine Eyes (cantata for SATB chorus, boys' chorus, bass ad lib., organ and harp (or piano), ad lib.) (1967)
- Op. 94: Concerto No. 3 [Diran (the Religious Singer)] (baritone horn (or trombone), strings) (1948)
- Op. 95: Three Songs (voice and piano) (1950)
- Op. 96: Suite for piano (1954/1967)
- Op. 97: Quartet No. 1 (flute, oboe, cello, harpsichord (or piano)) (1936/1952)
- Op. 98, No. 1: Partita [for piano and strings] (undated; 1950s per Kunze)
- Op. 98, No. 2: Concerto No. 4 [Tel El Armarna] (orchestra [322(eh)2 4231, timpani, harp, strings]) (1952)
- Op. 98, No. 3: Concerto No. 5 [for piano and strings] (undated; 1950s per Kunze)
- Op. 99: Suite for violin, piano and percussion (1950; 1951 per Kunze)
- Op. 100, No. 1: Ave Maria (boys' (or women's SSAA) voices, 2 oboes (or trumpets or clarinets), 2 horns (or trombones), harp (or piano)) (1955)
- Op. 100, No. 2: Christmas Ode [As on the Night] (soprano, celesta, strings) (1952)
- Op. 100, No. 3: The Beatitudes (SATB chorus, 2 oboes, 2 horns, harp, celesta, strings) (1955)
- Op. 100, No. 4: Easter Cantata (soprano, SATB chorus, 2 oboes, 2 horns, 3 trumpets, tam-tam, harp, celesta, strings) (1953)
- Op. 101: Hanna (2 clarinets and 2 pianos) (1951)
- Op. 102: Orbit No. 2 (piano (or alto recorder and piano)) (1952)
- Op. 103: Jhala (piano solo) (1951)
- Op. 104: Allegro on a Pakistan Lute Tune (piano solo) (1952)
- Op. 105: Make a Joyful Noise (cantata for baritone (or tenor), SATB chorus, 2 trumpets, 2 trombones, organ (or piano)) (1966)
- Op. 106: Gamelan and Jhala (carillon) (1951)
- Op. 107: Island Sunrise (orchestra [33(eh)3(bcl)3 4331, timpani, 6 percussion, 2 pianos, celesta, strings]) (1964; 1965 per New Grove)
- Op. 108: Sextet (violin and 5 percussion) (1966)
- Op. 109: Piano Quintet No. 2 (piano and string quartet) (1964)
- Op. 110: Two Sonatas (for koto (or harp)) (1962)
- Op. 111, No. 1: Pastorale No. 1 (piano solo) (1952)
- Op. 111, No. 2: Hymn to a Celestial Musician (piano solo) (1951)
- Op. 112: Quartet No. 2 (flute, oboe, cello, piano) (1950)
- Op. 113: Three Haikus (piano solo) (1965)
- Op. 114: Concerto No. 6 [Harmonica Concerto] (harmonica (or flute or oboe) and strings) (1953)
- Op. 114a: Concerto No. 6 [Harmonica Concerto] (harmonica and piano) (1953)
- Op. 115: Canticle (soprano, oboe, xylophone, harp, celesta, strings) (1953)
- Op. 116: Concerto No. 7 ["for orchestra"] (2222 4231, timpani, percussion, harp, celesta, strings) (1953)
- Op. 117: Concerto No. 8 ["for orchestra"] (2222 2210, timpani, percussion, harp, strings) (1957)
- Op. 118: Sonata No. 1 for flute (solo) (1964)
- Op. 119: Mountain Idylls ["3 easy pieces for piano"] (1931/49/55)
- Op. 120: Sonatina (for piano solo) (1962)
- Op. 121: Sonata for ryuteki and sho (ryuteki (or flute), and sho (or organ)) (undated; 1968 per Kunze)
- Op. 122: Duet (for violin and harpsichord) (1957; 1954 per Kunze)
- Op. 123: Vision from High Rock (orchestra [2222 2200, timpani, percussion, harp, celesta, strings]) (1954)
- Op. 123, No. 3: Concerto No. 10 ["for 2 pianos"] (orchestra [2222 4230, timpani, percussion, 2 pianos, strings]) (1954) [see Op. 342, Symphony No. 45]
- Op. 124: Glory to God (soprano, alto, SATB chorus, orchestra [0000 a saxophone 4400, timpani, 2 percussion, organ (or piano)]) (1954)
- Op. 125: The Flowering Peach (clarinet, saxophone, timpani, tam-tam, vibraphone, glockenspiel, harp, celesta) (1954) [incidental music to the play by Clifford Odets ]
- Op. 126: The Stars (soprano, SATB chorus, English horn, harp, celesta, strings) (1955)
- Op. 127: Sonata for harp (harp solo) (1954; 1975 per Kunze)
- Op. 128: Prelude and Quadruple Fugue (orchestra [2222 4230, timpani, strings]) (1936, rev. 1954)
- Op. 129: Tower Music (suite, for 9 winds [1111 2111]) (1955)
- Op. 130: Sonata for 2 oboes and organ (1963–64)
- Op. 131: The Brightness of Our Noon (madrigal for SATB chorus) (1954)
- Op. 132: Symphony No. 2, Mysterious Mountain (orchestra [3333 5331, timpani, harp, celesta, strings]) (1955)
- Op. 133, No. 1: The World Beneath the Sea No. 1 (alto saxophone, harp, vibraphone, timpani, gong) (1954)
- Op. 133, No. 2: The World Beneath the Sea No. 2 (clarinet, timpani, bells (chimes or glockenspiel), harp, double bass) (1963)
- Op. 134: Immortality (soprano, SATB choir, organ (or piano)) (undated; 1962 per Kunze)
- Op. 135: October Mountain (suite, for percussion sextet) (1942, rev. 1953)
- Op. 136: Ko-ola-u (for 2 pianos, 4 hands) (1962)
- Op. 137: O God Our Help in Ages Past (SATB choir and organ (or piano)) (1928; rev. 1963?; 1958 per Kunze)
- Op. 138: Dawn Hymn (organ) (1953)
- Op. 139: O Lady Moon (soprano (or SSA chorus), clarinet, piano) (1953)
- Op. 140: The God of Glory Thundereth (tenor (or soprano), SATB chorus, organ (or piano)) (1935, rev. 1960)
- Op. 141: Anabasis (speaker, soprano, bass, SATB chorus, orchestra [12(eh)10 2100, timpani, percussion, harp, strings]) (1955)
- Op. 142: Out of the Depths (voice and organ (or piano), (or soprano, SATB choir, organ)) (1938, rev. 1959)
- Op. 143: Ad Lyram (SATB soli, SATB double chorus, orchestra [33(eh)3(bcl)3(cbsn) 5331, timpani, percussion, harp, strings]) (1956)
- Op. 144 [aka Op. 144a]: Macedonian Mountain Dance (piano solo) (1937)
- Op. 144a: Macedonian Mountain Dance (orchestra [2222 4331, timpani, percussion, strings]) (1964?)
- Op. 144b: Mountain Dance No. 2 (piano solo) (1937, rev. 1962)
- Op. 145: Sonata for piano (1956)
- Op. 146: To the God Who is in the Fire (tenor, TTBB chorus, 6 percussion) (1955, rev. 1966; rev. 1965 per Kunze)
- Op. 147: String Quartet No. 2 [Adanad Suite] (1950)
- Op. 148: Symphony No. 3 (orchestra [3333 5331, timpani, percussion, harp, strings]) (1956)
- Op. 149: Hear My Prayer, O Lord (SSATBB chorus with optional organ (or piano) (1936/59)
- Op. 150: Seven Greek Folk Dances (harmonica and strings (or piano)) (1956)
- Op. 150, No. 2: Three Greek Folk Dances (orchestra [3222 4331, timpani, 3 percussion, harp, strings]) (1956) [arrangements of three movements from Op. 150]
- Op. 151: O Goddess of the Sea (low voice and piano) (1957)
- Op. 152: Do You Remember the Last Silence? (piano solo) (1957)
- Op. 153: Dawn at Laona (low voice and piano) (1967)
- Op. 154: Persephone (low voice and piano) (1957)
- Op. 155: Meditation on Orpheus (orchestra [3333 4331, timpani, percussion, harp, celesta, strings]) (1957–58, rev. c. 1970)
- Op. 156: The Moon has a Face (medium voice and piano) (1932)
- Op. 157: Magnificat (SATB soli, SATB choir, orchestra [0200 2210, percussion, harp, strings], (or piano or organ)) (1958)
- Op. 158: Look Toward the Sea (baritone, SATB chorus, trombone, organ) (1958)
- Op. 159: Quintet (for flute, oboe, clarinet, bassoon, horn) (1960, rev. 1965)
- Op. 160: Praise ye Him, All His Angels (bass, SATB chorus, organ (or piano)) (1958)
- Op. 160a: Let Them Praise the Name of the Lord (SATB chorus and organ (or piano)) (1958)
- Op. 161: O for a Shout of Sacred Joy (SATB choir and organ (or piano)) (1958)
- Op. 162: Unto Thee will I Cry (SATB chorus and organ (or piano)) (undated; 1958 per Kunze)
- Op. 163: In Memory of an Artist (suite, for strings) (1958, rev. 1968; 1963 per Kunze)
- Op. 164, No. 1: Sextet (alto recorder, string quartet, harpsichord) (1958)
- Op. 164, No. 2: Shepherd of Israel (tenor cantor, soprano recorder (or flute), trumpet ad lib., string quartet (or string orchestra)) (1953; 1952 per Kunze)
- Op. 165: Symphony No. 4 (wind orchestra, 4 percussion, harp) (1959; 1957 per Kunze; 1958 per New Grove)
- Op. 166: Suite for accordion (solo) (1958)
- Op. 167: Glory to Man (SABar soli, and organ) (1958)
- Op. 168: Child in the Garden (piano (4 hands)) (1958)
- Op. 169: Live in the Sun (medium voice and celesta (or piano)) (1954, rev. 1960)
- Op. 170: Symphony No. 5 [Short Symphony] (orchestra [2222 4331, timpani, percussion, celesta, harp, strings]) (1953, rev. 1963)
- Op. 171: Sonata for hichiriki and sho [Cry of the Phoenix] (hichiriki and sho (or oboe and organ)) (1962)
- Op. 172: Blue Flame [A Musical Fairy Tale] (opera for STB soli, SATB chorus, orchestra [2222 4231, timpani, percussion, harp, strings]) (1959)
- Op. 173: Symphony No. 6 [Celestial Gate] (small orchestra [1111 1100, timpani, chime, harp, strings]) (1959; rev. 1960 per New Grove)
- Op. 174: Concerto for accordion and orchestra (accordion, orchestra [2222 2000, timpani, harp, strings]) (1959)
- Op. 175: Lake of Van Sonata (piano) (1946, rev. 1959)
- Op. 176, No. 1: Madras Sonata (piano) (1947, rev. 1951, 1959)
- Op. 176, No. 2: Yenovk (The Troubadour) (piano solo) (1947, rev. 1951)
- Op. 177: Shalimar [Suite for piano] (1950, rev, 1951)
- Op. 178: Symphony No. 7 [Nanga Parvat] (wind orchestra, 4 percussion, harp) (1959)
- Op. 179: Symphony No. 8 [Arjuna (originally titled Ardos)] (orchestra 11(eh)11 1000, timpani, piano, strings) (1947)
- Op. 180: Symphony No. 9 [Saint Vartan] (orchestra [0000 a saxophone 1410, timpani, percussion, piano, strings) (1949–50) [originally Op. 80, per New Grove]
- Op. 181: Koke No Niwa [Moss Garden] (English horn (or B♭ clarinet), 2 percussion, harp) (1954, rev. 1960)
- Op. 182: Fuji (cantata for female voices, flute, harp (or piano), strings) (1960, rev. 1964)
- Op. 183: Wind Drum [Dance Drama] (unison male (or female or mixed) voices (or bass or alto), solo (or group) dancer(s), flute, timpani, 2 percussion, harp, strings) (1962)
- Op. 183a: Dance of the Black-Haired Mountain Storm (flute and 3 percussion (timpani, xylophone, bass drum) (1962) [arrangement of 11th movement of Op. 183]
- Op. 184: Symphony No. 10 [Vahaken] (orchestra [11(eh)11 1110, timpani, percussion, harp, strings]) (1959; rev. 1965 per New Grove)
- Op. 185: The Burning House (1-act opera, for 2 baritones, dancer, chorus (of 8 baritones or any multiple thereof), flute, 4 percussion, timpani, bass drum, tam-tam, xylophone, marimba, glockenspiel, vibraphone, chimes in C,D,D,F,G,G,A) (undated; 1959/62 per Kunze; 1960 per New Grove)
- Op. 185a: Overture to The Burning House (flute and 4 percussion) (1959)
- Op. 186: Symphony No. 11 [All Men Are Brothers] (orchestra) (1960, rev. 1969)
- Op. 187: From the End of the Earth (SATB choir and organ (or piano)) (1951, rev. 1960)
- Op. 188: Symphony No. 12 [Choral] (SATB chorus, flute, 2 trumpets, timpani, 2 percussion, harp, strings, and ad lib. recording of a mountain waterfall) (1960; 1969 per Kunze)
- Op. 188b: The Lord is My Shepherd [from Symphony No. 12] (SATB chorus and organ (or piano, or 6 violins) (1960)
- Op. 188, Nos. 2–4: Psalm 23 [from Symphony No. 12] (SATB chorus and orchestra (or organ or piano) (1960)
- Op. 189: Armenian Rhapsody No. 3 (strings) (1944)
- Op. 190: Symphony No. 13 (orchestra [11(eh)11 1000, timpani, percussion, harp, strings]) (1953; revision of 1945 Martha Graham Ardent Song)
- Op. 191: Poseidon Sonata (piano) (1957)
- Op. 192: Bardo Sonata (piano) 1959)
- Op. 193, No. 1: Suite for cello and piano (undated; 1961 per Kunze)
- Op. 193, No. 2: Yakamochi (cello solo) (1965)
- Op. 194: Symphony No. 14 [Ararat] (wind orchestra [5(2 piccolos)363 6661, 6 percussion]; or symphony for band) (1960; 1961 per New Grove)
- Op. 195: Mountain of Prophecy (orchestra [3322 4331, timpani, percussion, 2 harps, strings]) (1960; 1961 per New Grove)
- Op. 196: Pilate (1-act opera, for alto and bass soli, bass chorus, 3 flutes, 3 trombones, 5 percussion) (1963)
- Op. 197: Spirit of the Avalanche (1-act opera, for coloratura soprano, 2 baritones, baritone chorus, flute, English horn, trumpet, trombone, 4 percussion, harp, strings) (1962)
- Op. 198: Three Visions of Saint Mesrob (violin and piano) (1962)
- Op. 199: Symphony No. 15 [Silver Pilgrimage] (orchestra [2222 4331, 3 percussion, harp, strings]) (1962)
- Op. 200: Sonata No. 1 for trumpet and organ (1962)
- Op. 201: Trio for violin, viola and cello (c.1962)
- Op. 202: Symphony No. 16 [Kayakeum] (orchestra [harp, timpani, 2 percussion, strings, and 6 Korean instruments: kayakeum, janggo, zwago (hanging drum), 3 pyunjong) (1962)
- Op. 203: Symphony No. 17 [Symphony for Metal Orchestra] (6 flutes, 3 trombones, 5 percussion) (1963)
- Op. 204: Circe (1111 1111, timpani, percussion, harp, strings) (1963) (ballet for the Martha Graham Dance Company)
- Op. 204a: Symphony No. 18 [Circe] (orchestra [2222 2231, timpani, 2 percussion, harp, celesta, strings]) (1963) (a slight reworking of Op. 204)
- Op. 205: Mysterious Horse Before the Gate (trombone and 5 percussion (glockenspiel, 2 vibraphones, chimes, giant tam-tam)) (1963)
- Op. 206: In the Beginning was the Word (alto, bass, SATB choir, orchestra [12(eh)10 0110, 3 percussion, harp, strings]) (1963)
- Op. 207: Meditation on Zeami (Orchestra [3333 4331, timpani, 3 percussion, harp, strings]) (1963; 1964 per New Grove)
- Op. 208, No. 1: String Quartet No. 3 [Reflections on my Childhood] (1968)
- Op. 208, No. 2: String Quartet No. 4 [The Ancient Tree] (1970)
- Op. 209: Floating World [(Ukiyo) – Ballade for Orchestra] (orchestra [3322 4331, timpani, 3 percussion, harp, strings; (ad lib. 4–7 percussion, 2 harps]) (1964)
- Op. 210: Bare November Day (harpsichord (or organ, clavichord or piano)) (undated; 1964 per Kunze)
- Op. 211: Fantasy on Japanese Wood Prints [Hanga Genso] (xylophone and orchestra [3222 4331, timpani, 3 percussion, harp, strings]) (1964)
- Op. 212: Dark River and Distant Bell (harpsichord (or piano or clavichord)) (undated; 1968 per Kunze)
- Op. 213: Return and Rebuild the Desolate Places (concerto for trumpet and wind orchestra [33(eh)3(bcl)3(cbsn) 4231, timpani, 2 percussion]) (c.1959)
- Op. 214: Five Visionary Landscapes (piano solo) (undated; 1967 per Kunze)
- Op. 215: The Travellers (1-scene opera, for 2 altos (or mezzo-sopranos), 2 basses, SATB chorus, 3 flutes, percussion, harp) (1965)
- Op. 216: Ode to the Temple of Sound (orchestra [3322 4331, timpani, percussion, harp (harp II ad lib.), celesta, strings]) (1965; 1966 per New Grove)
- Op. 217: Symphony No. 19 [Vishnu] (orchestra [3333 4331, timpani, 6–4 percussion, 2 harps, celesta, strings]) (1966)
- Op. 218: The Holy City (trumpet, chimes (or bell in A), harp, strings) (1965? 1967?)
- Op. 219: The Leper King [dance drama] (baritone, male (or mixed) voices (8 parts), 3 flutes, trumpet, timpani, 2 percussion) (undated; 1967 per Kunze; 1965 per New Grove)
- Op. 220: Fra Angelico [Fantasy for orchestra] (3333 4321, timpani, 4 percussion, 2 harps, celesta, strings) (1967)
- Op. 221: Adoration (cantata for voice (or women's chorus with soprano and alto solos; or men's chorus with tenor and bass solos), flute, oboe, clarinet, trumpet, trombone, celesta, chimes, strings) (1967)
- Op. 222: Praise the Lord with Psaltery (cantata for SATB chorus, and orchestra [323(bcl)3(cbsn) 4331, timpani, tam-tam, large chimes, harp, celesta, strings]) (undated; 1969 per Kunze)
- Op. 223: Symphony No. 20 [Three Journeys to a Holy Mountain] (for full band) (1968)
- Op. 224: Requiem and Resurrection (brass ensemble [0000 4231, timpani, 3 percussion]) (1968)
- Op. 225: Mountains and Rivers Without End (chamber symphony for 10 players [1110 0110, timpani, 3 percussion, harp]) (1968)
- Op. 226: Vibration Painting (13 strings [7 violins, 3 violas, 2 cellos, double bass]) (undated; 1960s per Kunze)
- Op. 227: Lady of Light (cantata for soprano, baritone, SATB chorus, orchestra [3222 4331, timpani, 4 percussion, harp, strings]) (1969)
- Op. 228: Shambala (concerto for violin, sitar, and orchestra [3222 4331, timpani, 4 percussion, harp, strings]) (undated; 1969 per Kunze)
- Op. 229, No. 1: And God Created Great Whales (taped whale sounds, orchestra [3(pic)222 4331, timpani, 4 percussion, harp, strings]) (1970)
- Op. 229, No. 2: A Rose for Miss Emily [ballet, scen. after William Faulkner story] (orchestra [1(pic)111 1111, timpani, percussion, piano, strings]) (1970; incorporates music from 1936 to 1940; 1969 per New Grove)
- Op. 230: Spirit of Ink (9 pieces for 3 flutes) (1968; 1970 per Kunze)
- Op. 231: Night of the Soul (bass (or baritone or men's chorus) and 3 flutes) (1968)
- Op. 232: Two Consolations (string quartet) (undated; 1960s per Kunze)
- Op. 233: All the World's a Dance of Snobbery (piano solo) (undated; 1960s per Kunze)
- Op. 234: Symphony No. 21 [Symphony Etchmiadzin] (2 trumpets, timpani, 2 percussion, strings) (1968; uses music from unpublished 1946 opera Etchmiadzin, Op. 62) [New Grove omits timpani and percussion]
- Op. 235: Saint Nerses the Graceful (3 clarinets) (1968)
- Op. 236: Symphony No. 22 City of Light (orchestra [3(pic)23(bcl)3(cbsn) 4331, timpani, 3 percussion, harp, strings]) (1970; 1971 per New Grove)
- Op. 237, No. 1: Nagooran (South Indian orchestra) (1960)
- Op. 237, No. 2: Nagooran (cello, timpani, glockenspiel, vibraphone, large chimes, giant tam-tam) (1964)
- Op. 238: Four Songs (low voice and piano) (1944–49)
- Op. 239: The Flute Player of the Armenian Mountains (low voice and Piano) (1945)
- Op. 240: Komachi (7 miniature tone poems for piano) (1971)
- Op. 241: Three Tsamicos (piano solo) (undated; 1970s per Kunze)
- Op. 242: Four Songs (low voice and piano) (1971)
- Op. 243: Saturn (cantata for soprano, clarinet and piano) (1971)
- Op. 244: Island of the Mysterious Bells (suite for 4 harps) (1971)
- Op. 245: The Garden of Adonis (suite for flute and harp (or piano) (1971)
- Op. 246, No. 1: David Wept for Slain Absalom (motet for baritone solo and SSATBB choir) (1971)
- Op. 246, No. 2: The Word of Our God Shall Stand Forever (motet for SSATBB and organ) (1971)
- Op. 246, No. 3: Heaven (An Echo Anthem (motet for SATB, (organ ad lib.)) (1971)
- Op. 246, No. 4: A Rose Tree Blossoms (motet for SSATBB, (organ ad lib.)) (1971)
- Op. 247: Hermes Stella (piano solo) (undated; 1971 per Kunze)
- Op. 248, No. 1: Afton Water (operetta, after William Saroyan play, for SSTBarB soli, SSS chorus, 3 clarinets, alto saxophone, 3 trumpets, 2 percussion, piano) (1951)
- Op. 248, No. 2: Three Improvisations (for full band, vibraphone, harp) (1952)
- Op. 248, No. 3: The Pitchman [ballet suite, scen. after William Saroyan] (2 alto recorders, piano, and celesta (or 2 flutes and 2 pianos)) (1953)
- Op. 248, No. 4: The Spook Sonata (alto saxophone and 3 pianos) (1954) [incidental music for Strindberg play]
- Op. 249: Symphony No. 23 [Ani] (large band with antiphonal brass choir II ad lib., string bass, timpani, tam-tam, bass drum, glockenspiel, marimba, vibraphone, xylophone, chimes) (1972)
- Op. 250, No. 1: Ruins of Ani (4 B♭ clarinets (or any multiple thereof) (1972)
- Op. 250, No. 2: Ruins of Ani (strings) (1972)
- Op. 251: Khorhoort Nahadagats [Holy Mystery of the Martyrs] (oud (or lute or guitar) and string orchestra (or quartet)) (1972; 1976 per Kunze)
- Op. 252, No. 1: Firdausi (clarinet, harp, percussion) (1972)
- Op. 252, No. 2: Shah-Nameh [Book of Kings] (film score) (1972)
- Op. 252, No. 3: Seven Love Songs of Saris (violin and piano) (undated; 1972 per Kunze)
- Op. 253: Spirit Cat (suite for soprano, vibraphone, marimba) (1971)
- Op. 254: Two Songs (soprano and piano) (undated; 1970s per Kunze)
- Op. 255: Sonata for cello and piano (1932/72)
- Op. 256: Hermit Bell-Ringer of the Tower (bass, men's chorus, flute, chimes) (1927/72)
- Op. 257: For the Waters are Come (motet for men's chorus) (1973)
- Op. 258: Three Madrigals (SATB chorus) (1972)
- Op. 259: Three Motets (alto and bass soli, SATB chorus) (1972)
- Op. 260: Dream of a Myth [ballet for Martha Graham] (orchestra [1111 1111, timpani, percussion, strings]) (1973)
- Op. 261: Les Baux (violin and piano) (1973)
- Op. 262: Quartet for clarinet, violin, viola and cello (1973)
- Op. 263: Night of a White Cat (clarinet and piano) (1973)
- Op. 264, No. 1: Tumburu (violin, cello, piano) (1973)
- Op. 264, No. 2: Varuna (violin, cello, piano) (1973)
- Op. 265: Two Biblical Songs (high soprano and piano (or organ) (1973; and 1974, per Kunze)
- Op. 266: Sonata for 2 bassoons (or bassoon and cello) (1973)
- Op. 267: Concerto for harp and strings (1973)
- Op. 268: Four Motets (SATB chorus) (1973)
- Op. 269, No. 1: Though Night is Dark (madrigal for SATB chorus) (1972)
- Op. 269, Nos. 2 & 3: Two Songs of Faith (SATB chorus) (1973)
- Op. 269, No. 4: Jesus Meek and Gentle (SATB chorus and organ) (1978)
- Op. 270: Suite for harp (1973)
- Op. 271: Pastorale and Fugue (2 flutes) (1973)
- Op. 272: Dawn on Mt. Tahoma (string orchestra) (1973)
- Op. 273: Symphony No. 24 [Majnun Symphony (tenor, SATB choir, trumpet, violin, strings) (1973)
- Op. 274: Three Sasa Songs (soprano and piano) (1973)
- Op. 275: Symphony No. 25 [Odysseus Symphony] (orchestra [1(pic)110 1111, timpani, percussion, strings]) (1973)
- Op. 276: O Lord, Bless Thy Mountains (2 pianos tuned a quarter-tone apart) (1974)
- Op. 277: Fantasy (double bass (or cello) and piano) (1974)
- Op. 278, No. 1: To the Cascade Mountains (film score suite for orchestra [3222 4331, timpani, 4 percussion, harp, strings]) (undated; 1970s per Kunze)
- Op. 278, No. 2: Ode to the Cascade Mountains (an excerpt from Op. 278, No. 1, with the same instrumentation and date)
- Op. 279: The Way of Jesus (oratorio for STB soli, SATB chorus, baritone chorus in unison, orchestra [3222 4331, timpani, 4 percussion, harp, 3 guitars, strings]) (1975)
- Op. 280: Symphony No. 26 [Consolation] (orchestra [3222 4331, timpani, 4 percussion, harp, strings]) (1975)
- Op. 281, No. 1: Fanfare to the New Atlantis (orchestra [0000 4331, timpani, chimes, tam-tam, strings) (1975)
- Op. 281, No. 2: Psalm to St. Alban (horn, 2 trumpets, trombone) (1974)
- Op. 282: A Simple Mass (SATB chorus (4-part unison voices) and organ) (undated; 1970s per Kunze)
- Op. 283: Pericles (opera, for SSSTBBB soli, SATB chorus, orchestra [3222 4331, timpani, 4 percussion, harp, strings]) (1975)
- Op. 284: Ode to Freedom (violin, orchestra [3222 4331, timpani, 4 percussion, harp, strings]) (1976)
- Op. 285: Symphony No. 27 (orchestra [1100 1100, timpani, percussion, strings]) (1976)
- Op. 286: Symphony No. 28 (orchestra [10(eh)00 0100, timpani, strings]) (1976)
- Op. 287: String Quartet No. 5 (1976)
- Op. 288: Sonatina [Meditation on Mt. Monadnock] (piano solo) (1977)
- Op. 289: Symphony No. 29 (baritone horn, and orchestra [3222 4331, timpani, 4 percussion, harp, strings]) (1976)
- Op. 290: Suite for 4 trumpets and trombone (1976)
- Op. 291: Suite for alto saxophone [E♭] and guitar (1976)
- Op. 292: Glory Sings the Setting Sun (cantata for coloratura soprano, clarinet, piano) (1977)
- Op. 293: Symphony No. 30 (orchestra [1100 0100, strings]) (1952/76)
- Op. 294: Symphony No. 31 (strings) (1976–77; 1977 per Kunze; 1976 per New Grove)
- Op. 295: Septet (for flute, clarinet, bass clarinet, trumpet, trombone, percussion, double bass) (1976)
- Op. 296: Symphony No. 32 [The Broken Wings] (orchestra [1110 1100, percussion, strings]) (1977)
- Op. 297: Sonata for 2 clarinets (1977)
- Op. 298: How I Love Thy Law (cantata for high soprano, clarinet, piano) (1977)
- Op. 299, No. 1: Mount Belknap (piano sonata) (1932, rev, 1977)
- Op. 299, No. 2: Mount Ossipee (piano sonata) (1935, rev. 1977)
- Op. 299, No. 3: Mount Shasta (piano sonata) (1936, rev. 1977)
- Op. 300: Suite for flute and guitar (1977)
- Op. 301: Fred the Cat (piano sonata) (1977)
- Op. 302: Sonata for oboe and bassoon (1977)
- Op. 303: Ananda (piano sonata) (1977)
- Op. 304: A Presentiment (coloratura soprano, piano) (1977)
- Op. 305: Celestial Canticle (coloratura soprano, piano) (1977)
- Op. 306: Harpsichord Sonata No. 1 (1977)
- Op. 307: Symphony No. 33 [Francis Bacon] (orchestra [101(bcl)0 0110, percussion, strings]) (1977)
- Op. 308: Rubaiyat of Omar Khayyam (speaker, accordion, orchestra [3222 4331, timpani, 4 percussion, strings]) (1975)
- Op. 309: Sketch Book of Mr. Purple Poverty [two books of easy piano pieces] (1978)
- Op. 310: Symphony No. 34 (bass trombone and strings) (1977)
- Op. 311: Symphony No. 35 [Ah-ak] (two orchestras: 1: [Korean Ahahk instruments: sogeum, daegeum, piri, haegeum, kayageum ad lib., keomongo ad lib., ahjaeng, janggu, jwago, pyeon kyeong, pyeon jong]; 2: [33(eh)3(bcl)3(cbsn) 4332, timpani, 4 percussion, harp, strings]) (1978)
- Op. 312: Symphony No. 36 (flute and orchestra [33(eh)3(bcl)3(cbsn) 4331, timpani, 3 percussion, harp, strings]) (1978)
- Op. 313: Symphony No. 37 (orchestra [2222 4331, timpani, bass drum, harp, strings]) (1978)
- Op. 314: Symphony No. 38 (high soprano, flute, trumpet, strings) (1978)
- Op. 315: Three Songs for high soprano and piano (1978)
- Op. 316: Guitar Sonata No. 1 (guitar solo) (1978)
- Op. 317: Sonata for flute (bass or alto flute solo) (1978)
- Op. 318: Harpsichord Sonata No. 2 (1978)
- Op. 319: Sunset on Mt. Tahoma (sonata for 2 trumpets, horn, trombone, organ) (1978)
- Op. 320: Teach me Thy Way (SSA chorus) (1978)
- Op. 321: Symphony No. 39 (guitar, orchestra [3322 4331, timpani, 2 percussion, harp, strings]) (1978)
- Op. 322: Sonata for clarinet and harpsichord (1978)
- Op. 323: Tale of the Sun Goddess Going into the Stone House (opera for coloratura soprano, STB soli, SATB chorus, orchestra [1000 0220, timpani, 2 percussion, strings (with solo violin)]) (1978, rev. 1981 & 1988)
- Op. 324: Symphony No. 40 (orchestra [0000 1211, timpani, strings]) (1979)
- Op. 325: Guitar Concerto No. 1 (guitar, orchestra [3322 4331, timpani, 3 percussion, strings]) (1979).
- Op. 326: Sonata No. 1 for 3 trumpets and 2 trombones (1979)
- Op. 327: Love Song Vanishing into Sounds of Crickets (piano solo) (1979)
- Op. 328: Sonata No. 2 for 3 trumpets and 2 trombones (1979)
- Op. 329: Guitar Sonata No. 2 (guitar solo) (1979)
- Op. 330: Symphony No. 41 (orchestra [0000 1210, strings) (1979)
- Op. 331: Trio for 3 saxophones [E♭ alto, B♭; tenor, E♭ baritone] (1979)
- Op. 332: Symphony No. 42 (orchestra [1000 0110, strings) (1979)
- Op. 333: Four Nocturnes (2 saxophones and piano) (1979)
- Op. 334: Symphony No. 43 (oboe, trumpet, timpani, strings) (1979)
- Op. 335: Mount Chocorua (sonata for piano) (1982; 1980 per Kunze)
- Op. 336: Harpsichord Sonata No. 3 (1979)
- Op. 337: On Christmas Eve a Child Cried Out (SATB chorus, flute, harp) (1979)
- Op. 338: Copernicus (tone poem for orchestra [2222 4330, timpani, 3 percussion, harp, strings]) (1960; 1980 per New Grove)
- Op. 339: Symphony No. 44 (orchestra [1100 0100, timpani, percussion, strings]) (1980)
- Op. 340: Blue Job Mountain (sonata for piano) (undated; 1979 per Kunze)
- Op. 341: Greek Rhapsody No. 2 (orchestra [3(pic)222 4331, timpani, strings]) (1972; 1980 per New Grove)
- Op. 342: Symphony No. 45 (orchestra [2222 4230, timpani, percussion, 2 pianos, strings]) (1954)
- Op. 343: Revelations of St. Paul (oratorio for STBar soli, SATB chorus, orchestra [3222 4331, timpani, 2 percussion, harp, strings]) (1980)
- Op. 344: Concerto for soprano saxophone (soprano saxophone, strings) (1980)
- Op. 345: Catamount (sonata for piano) (1980)
- Op. 346: Prospect Hill (sonata for piano) (1980)
- Op. 347: Symphony No. 46 [To the Green Mountains] (orchestra [3222 4331, timpani, 3 percussion, harp, strings]) (1980; 1980–81 per New Grove)
- Op. 348: Symphony No. 47 [Walla Walla, Land of Many Waters] (coloratura soprano, orchestra [3322 4331, timpani, 3 percussion, harp, strings]) (1980; 1981 per New Grove)
- Op. 349: Sonata No. 2 for trumpet and organ [The Divine Fountain] (1981)
- Op. 350, No. 1: Stars Sing Bell Song (coloratura soprano and Javanese gamelan) (1981)
- Op. 350, No. 2: Pleiades (Javanese gamelan solo) (1981)
- Op. 351: Corruption in Office (piano solo) (1981; 1939, rev. 1981 per Kunze)
- Op. 352: Organ Sonata No. 1 (1981)
- Op. 353: Lalezar (4 songs for bass voice and orchestra [3322 4331, timpani, 3 percussion, harp, strings]) (1981)
- Op. 354: Journey to Arcturus (sonata for piano) (1981)
- Op. 355: Symphony No. 48 [Vision of Andromeda] (orchestra [3222 4331, timpani, 4 percussion, harp, strings]) (1981; 1982 per New Grove)
- Op. 356: Symphony No. 49 [Christmas Symphony] (strings) (1981)
- Op. 357: Harpsichord Sonata No. 4 [Daddy-long-legs] (1981)
- Op. 358: Psalm (brass quartet) (1981)
- Op. 359: God is our Refuge and Strength (SATB chorus, orchestra [3222 4331, timpani, 3 percussion, strings (or organ and timpani)]) (1981)
- Op. 360: Symphony No. 50 Mount St. Helens (orchestra [33(eh)22 4331, timpani, 4 percussion, harp, strings]) (1982)
- Op. 361: Harpsichord Sonata No. 5 (1982)
- Op. 362: Dance Ghazal (piano solo) (1930; 1931 per Kunze)
- Op. 363: Lake Winnipesaukee (sextet for flute, oboe, cello, 2 percussion, piano) (1982)
- Op. 364: Symphony No. 51 (trumpet, strings) (1982)
- Op. 365: Shigure [Japanese poem set to music] (soprano and piano) (1982)
- Op. 366: Hiroshige's Cat Bathing (sonata for piano) (1982)
- Op. 367: On the Long Total Eclipse of the Moon, July 6, 1982 (sonata for piano) (1982)
- Op. 368: Tsugouharu Fujita's Sleeping Cat (sonata for piano) (1982)
- Op. 369: Lake Sammamish (sonata for piano) (1982)
- Op. 370: Love's Philosophy (voice and piano) (1984)
- Op. 371: Campuan Sonata (viola and piano) (1982)
- Op. 372: Symphony No. 52 [Journey to Vega] (orchestra [1111 2211, timpani, strings (or string quintet)] (1983; 1982 per New Grove)
- Op. 373: Prelude and Fugue (brass quartet) (1983)
- Op. 374: Spirit of Trees (sonata for harp and guitar) (1983)
- Op. 375: Sonata for clarinet and piano (1983)
- Op. 376: The Waves Unbuild the Wasting Shore (cantata for tenor, SATB chorus, organ) (1983)
- Op. 377: Symphony No. 53 [Star Dawn] (band, timpani, 4 percussion) (1983)
- Op. 378: Symphony No. 54 (orchestra [2222 4331, timpani, strings]) (1983)
- Op. 379: Symphony No. 55 (orchestra [3222 4331, timpani, percussion, harp, piano, strings]) (1983)
- Op. 380: Symphony No. 56 (orchestra [3222 4331, timpani, piano, strings]) (1983)
- Op. 381: Symphony No. 57 [Cold Mountain] (tenor/soprano, clarinet, strings (or string quintet)) (1983)
- Op. 382: Sonatina for organ (1983)
- Op. 383: Killer of Enemies (flute, clarinet, trumpet trombone, percussion, violin, double bass) (1983)
- Op. 384: Starry Night (flute, xylophone, harp) (1985)
- Op. 385: Cantate Domino (SATB chorus and organ) (1984)
- Op. 386: Organ Sonata No. 2 [Invisible Sun] (1984)
- Op. 387: Sonata for alto recorder and harpsichord (1984)
- Op. 388: Lilydale (piano solo) (1986)
- Op. 389: Symphony No. 58 [Symphony Sacra] (soprano, baritone soli, SATB chorus, flute, horn, trumpet, timpani, chimes, harp, strings) (1985)
- Op. 390: Cougar Mountain (sonata for piano) (1985)
- Op. 391: The Spirit's Map (voice and piano) (1977)
- Op. 392: Mountain Under the Sea (E♭ alto saxophone, timpani, vibraphone, tam-tam, harp) (1984)
- Op. 393: Dawn on a Mountain Lake (double bass and piano) (1977)
- Op. 394: Guitar Concerto No. 2 (guitar and strings) (1985)
- Op. 395: Symphony No. 59 [Bellevue] (orchestra [3322 4331, timpani, 4 percussion, harp, strings]) (1985; 1986 per Kunze)
- Op. 396: Symphony No. 60 To the Appalachian Mountains (orchestra [3322 4331, timpani, 4 percussion, harp, strings]) (1985)
- Op. 397: Symphony No. 61 (orchestra [3222 4331, timpani, 4 percussion, harp, strings]) (1986)
- Op. 398: Srpouhi (duet for violin and piano) (1977)
- Op. 399: Sonata for Piano (1986)
- Op. 400: A Friendly Mountain (bass voice and piano) (1986)
- Op. 401: Bless the Lord (cantata for tenor, SATB choir, organ) (1986)
- Op. 402: Symphony No. 62 [Oh Let Man Not Forget These Words Divine] (baritone, trumpet, strings) (1987–88)
- Op. 403: Trio for violin, viola, cello (1986)
- Op. 404: Sonata for Brass Quartet [Chomulungma (Mt. Everest)] (2 trumpets, horn, trombone) (1986)
- Op. 405: Mount Katahdin (sonata for piano) (1987)
- Op. 406: Sonata for flute and harp (1987)
- Op. 407: The Frog Man (chamber opera for coloratura soprano, STBarB soli, men's chorus, 2 flutes, 2 percussion) (1987)
- Op. 408: God the Reveller (flute, clarinet, trumpet, trombone, violin, double bass, 1 percussion) (1987) [Music for Erick Hawkins ballet Plains Daybreak]
- Op. 409: Duet for violin and cello (1987)
- Op. 410: The Aim was Song (double chorus (chorus 1: SAB, chorus 2: SATB), 2 flutes, piano) (1987)
- Op. 411: Symphony No. 63 Loon Lake (orchestra [1(pic)1(eh)22 2210, timpani, 1 percussion (large chimes, glockenspiel), harp, strings]) (1988)
- Op. 412: Concerto No. 9 (piano and strings) (1954)
- Op. 413: Concerto No. 10 (piano, trumpet, strings) (1988)
- Op. 414: Harpsichord Sonata No. 6 (1988)
- Op. 415: Lake Samish (violin, clarinet, piano) (1988)
- Op. 416: Sno Qualmie (clarinet, timpani, chimes, harp, double bass) (undated; 1980s per Kunze)
- Op. 417: Why is My Verse So Barren of New Pride? (baritone voice and piano) (1988)
- Op. 418: Out of Silence (cantata for SATB chorus, trumpet, string orchestra (or quintet) (1989)
- Op. 419: Consolation (piano solo) (1989)
- Op. 420: Harpsichord Sonata No. 7 [Journey to Sanahin] (1950)
- Op. 421, No. 1: Guitar Sonata No. 3 (undated)
- Op. 421, No. 2: Guitar Sonata No. 4 (undated)
- Op. 421, No. 3: Guitar Sonata No. 5 (undated)
- Op. 422: Symphony No. 64 [Agiochook] (trumpet, strings) (undated)
- Op. 423: Sonata for solo viola (1992)
- Op. 424: Sonata for organ [Hermit Thrush] (undated; 1988 per Kunze)
- Op. 425: Three Songs for low voice and piano (1934) [see Op. 19]
- Op. 426: Dream Flame (low voice and piano) (1940–1950?; 1950 per Kunze)
- Op. 427: Symphony No. 65 [Artsakh] (orchestra [3222 4331, timpani, 4 percussion, harp, strings]) (1991)
- Op. 428: Symphony No. 66, Hymn to Glacier Peak, (orchestra [3222 4331, timpani, 3 percussion, harp, strings]) (1992)
- Op. 429: Symphony No. 67 [Hymn to the Mountains] (orchestra [3222 4331, timpani, 3 percussion, harp, strings]) (1992; 1991 per Kunze)
- Op. 430: Concerto for oboe and orchestra (3222 4331, timpani, bell, harp, strings) (1992)
- Op. 431: Violin Concerto No. 2 (violin, orchestra [3222 4331, timpani, 3 percussion, harp, strings]) (1993)
- Op. 432, No. 1: Pastime with Good Company (flute, drum, timpani, SATB chorus) (1994)
- Op. 432, No. 2: The Baby's Dance (flute, harp, SATB chorus) (1994)
- Op. 433: How Lovely Are Thy Dwellings (guitar and SATB chorus) (1995)
- Op. 434: Habakkuk (organ) (1995)
