= Symphony No. 1 (Hovhaness) =

Symphony by Alan Hovhaness

The Symphony No. 1, Op. 17, Exile is the first symphony by the American composer Alan Hovhaness. The piece was composed in 1936 and was premiered by the BBC Symphony Orchestra under the conductor Leslie Heward in 1939. The work commemorates the genocide of the Armenian people, including Hovhaness's paternal family, during the Ottoman Turkish occupation of World War I. The symphony is dedicated to English writer and philosopher Francis Bacon.

The work's U.S. premiere was given on 6 December 1942 by the NBC Symphony Orchestra conducted by Leopold Stokowski. This performance was broadcast over the radio.

Around 1970 the composer replaced the central movement with a completely new one.

== Reception ==
Response to the premiere was positive, with Leslie Heward heralding Hovhaness as a "young genius." However, later reception of the work has not always been as favourable. Reviewing a recording of Exile by Gerard Schwarz and the Seattle Symphony Orchestra, Anthony Burton of BBC Music Magazine wrote, "Hovhaness’s astonishing productivity is achieved at the cost of self-criticism: the folk-like melodies can all too often seem four-square and predictable, the chromatic decoration banal doodling, the technically proficient fugues simply note-spinning." Burton added, "Not even the skilful and ardent advocacy of the Seattle Symphony, beautifully recorded, can persuade me that there is [...] much more than the picturesque about the early Exile Symphony."

== See also ==
- List of compositions by Alan Hovhaness

== Bibliography ==
- Grimshaw, Kristen (2005). Woodstra, Chris; Brennan, Gerald; Schrott, Allen (eds.). All Music Guide to Classical Music: The Definitive Guide to Classical Music. Backbeat Books. ISBN 0879308656.
