= Yenovk Der Hagopian =

Armenian born American artist and musician (1900–1966)

Yenovk Der Hagopian Ենովք Տեր-3ակոբեան
- Born: May 24, 1900; Ishkhanikom, Western Armenia
- Died: March 15, 1966 (aged 65); United States
- Occupations: painter, sculptor and musician

Yenovk Der Hagopian (Armenian: Ենովք Տեր-Հակոբյան; May 24, 1900 – March 15, 1966) was a 20th-century American-Armenian artist, sculptor and musician.

== Personal life ==
Yenovk Der Hagopian was born in Ishkhanikom, Western Armenia, near Van, Turkey. His father, Hagop, was a priest at the Cathedral of the Holy Cross. During the Armenian genocide, Yenovk and his family fled to Yerevan with the help of an American missionary. In 1916, he studied art in Tiflis, was later employed with the Near East Relief Foundation, and served as the director of two orphanages in Nor Bayezid and Yerevan between 1918 and 1923. Der Hagopian walked with a limp his entire life, carrying a bullet in his leg from his time in the military during the February Uprising. He married Nevart Kalarchian in August 1948, and later moved to Yonkers, New York together where they lived for over a decade.

== Art career ==
In 1923, Der Hagopian immigrated from Turkey to United States, eventually settled in Boston, and later met Arshile Gorky in Watertown, Massachusetts who found him a job at the Hood Rubber Factory. He also attended courses at the Massachusetts School of Art studying painting and drawing, in addition to the Copley Society Art School. In 1930, Der Hagopian moved to New York City and during the 1930s he participated in group exhibits and solo exhibitions, with his modern oil paintings featured in both New York City and Boston. Most of his subjects were religious, and many focused on the Armenian genocide of 1915. In 1939, he created Night in Exile, a carving which depicts the plight of an Armenian family; he later painted a piece with the same title.

During the 1960s, he produced seven carvings – made of wood, stone, and metal – replicating the architecture of ancient Armenian churches, which entered the collection of the Armenian Museum of America after his death. The New York Times reviewed the church sculptures, commenting that Der Hagopian preserved Armenian heritage in the work, as each sculpture represented a scale model of the principle churches and monasteries of old Armenia - including some dating to the third century AD. His largest models would take up to three weeks to complete, using photographs and blueprints of the churches for the inspiration. Years later, a large portion of his unknown work was rediscovered by his granddaughter during a home renovation at the end of the twentieth century.

Der Hagopian is also well known for his carvings, specifically Armenian khatchkars. His magnum opus, completed in 1985, is a large intricately carved wooden khatchkar featuring images of his hometown in Van and his late family.

== Music career ==
Der Hagopian's family in Armenia was heavily involved in music, including traveling musical troubadours. In 1942, artist Hyman Bloom introduced Der Hagopian to composer Alan Hovhaness. Hovhaness praised Der Hagopian of him commenting that he "was a fine singer of folk music, a fine troubadour type of singer. A singer of Sayat Nova. A singer in pure style. This proved to be a great influence." In 1943, Yenovk released his first album containing eight Armenian folk songs, entitled Ashoogh Records Volume 1, which the New York Times praised as it "convey[ed] the flavor of the folk style". In 1946, he released his second album duly entitled Ashoogh Records Volume 2. Over his career, Der Hagopian performed both public concerts in the northeast US, and for the American-Soviety Music Society. Der Hagopian donated all the royalties he made from his albums to the Armenian church.

== Exhibitions ==
In 1985, Yenovk's magnum opus, a large wooden khatchkar depicting images of Van, entitled "In Memory to the Countless Armenian Martyrs of 1915" was displayed at Arlington National Cemetery during services commemorating the 70th anniversary of the Armenian Genocide. In 2016, the Armenian Museum of America (AMA) showed 20 works of the artist in an exhibition entitled "Untold Story of an Armenian-American Artist". Following the opening in Brooklyn and a stop at the Armenian Museum of America, the exhibition will travel to Los Angeles, Washington DC, Miami, Toronto, and Paris, France.
