= Haroutioun Hovanes Chakmakjian =

American scientist (1878–1973)

- Born: 20 October 1878; Adana, Ottoman Empire
- Died: 22 May 1973 (aged 94); Jamaica Plain, Massachusetts, US
- Other name: H. H. Chakmakjian
- Occupations: Author, writer, linguist, chemist

Haroutioun Hovanes "H.H." Chakmakjian (Armenian: Հարություն Հովանես Չաքմաքչյան; 20 October 1878, in Adana, Ottoman Empire − 22 May 1973, in Jamaica Plain, Massachusetts, United States) was a published scientist, as well as the father of American composer Alan Hovhaness. A professor of chemistry at Tufts University, Chakmakjian wrote numerous books in several languages. His notable publications included an English-Armenian dictionary which is believed to be the first of its kind in the modern Armenian language. The dictionary has become an enduring work of Armenian lexicography and remains regularly used today. His other publications included a 700-page history of Armenia.

== Family/early background ==
Chakmakjian was of Armenian background and was born in Adana, Ottoman Empire on 20 October 1878. His surname (which derives from the word Turkish çakmak, meaning "flintlock") means "gunsmith," a name given to one of his ancestors who had been skilled in creating finely engraved and decorated firearms.

Born in 1878, his parents were Hovanes L. Chakmakjian and Cohar Garabed Janbazian, both farmers. He studied at the Abcarian (Apcarian) High School in Adana, then studied for just over one year at the Antoura French Missionary College in Beirut.

== Career ==
Chakmakjian began his career as a teacher and taught in Gesaria (Kayseri today) and in Giresun. He taught in Beirut in the early years of the 20th century, during the time of one of the early Ottoman massacres of Armenians. Rather than return to his birthplace of Adana, he decided to take a ship to France. He subsequently moved to Stamford, Connecticut and eventually settled in Boston, Massachusetts, where he studied at Harvard University from fall 1905 to spring 1908. He re-enrolled at Harvard again in February 1912, obtaining an AB degree in June 1913 (as a member of the class of 1909).

He later served as a professor of chemistry and biochemistry at Tufts College, and was affiliated with the Tufts Medical School on Huntington Avenue in Boston. He retired from the medical school in 1949. Thereafter, in 1955, Chakmakjian retired from Tufts University as a professor emeritus.

== Literary work ==
In addition to his scientific work, in 1908 Chakmakjian became the chief-editor for The Hairenik newspaper while studying at Harvard, remaining in that position until February 1912. He also authored A Comprehensive Dictionary English-Armenian of approximately 1,600 pages published under the name H. H. Chakmakjian, printed in 1922 by Yeran Press in Boston. The dictionary was republished several times till that date. Other scholarly articles included topics related to chemistry, biochemistry, and the Armenian language. Among his other publications was a book of about 700 pages on the history of Armenia published in 1917.

== Personal life ==
On May 28, 1910, in Somerville, Massachusetts, he married Madeleine Scott (died October 3, 1930), an American woman of Scottish and English descent who had graduated from Wellesley College. They had one son, Alan Hovhannes, a future composer who reached international fame, who was born on 8 March 1911.

Chakmakjian died of bronchopneumonia in Jamaica Plain, Massachusetts on May 22, 1973, aged 94.

== Honors ==
Chakmakjian was a member of the American Chemical Society, was a Fellow of the American Association for the Advancement of Science, and a member of the New England Association of Chemistry Teachers.

== Publications ==
Some of Chakmakjian's publications include:

- Sahmanadrakan kaṛavarutiunner, Volume 1 (English: Constitutional Governments) (1910: Boston)
- Armeno-American letter writer, containing a large variety of model letters adapted to all occasions letters of friendship, letters of congratulation and condolence, letters of love, business letters. (1914: Boston)
- Skapeni charachchi hnaramtutiunnere: katakergutiin erek araruatsov (Armenian translation of Molière's play The Miser) (Boston: 1914)
- Kerakan-entertsaran: kerakan ev mayreni lezu (English: Literary reader: Literature and the mother language) (Boston: 1916)
- Endardzak patmutiun hayots: skizbēn minchev mer orere patkerazard (Comprehensive history of Armenians: from the beginning till today) (Boston: 1917)
- A Comprehensive Dictionary, English-Armenian (Boston: 1922)
- Hairenik and Its Workers: Memories of Seventeen Years (Published in the Armenian Review: 1979)
