= Leo Rich Lewis =

American classical composer

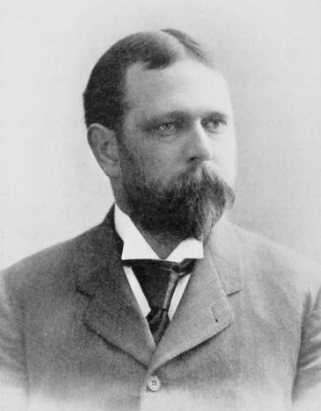
- Born: February 11, 1865; Woodstock, Vermont, US
- Died: September 8, 1945 (aged 80); Cambridge, Massachusetts, US
- Education: Tufts College; Harvard University
- Occupation: Composer
- Spouse: Carrie Bullard (m. 1892)

Leo Rich Lewis (February 11, 1865 – September 8, 1945) was an American composer.

== Biography ==
Leo Rich Lewis was born in Woodstock, Vermont on February 11, 1865. He graduated from Tufts College in Massachusetts in 1887, and earned two degrees from Harvard University in 1888 and 1889. He later served as Fletcher Professor of Music and chairman of the music department there from 1892 to 1945. He taught courses in music history and theory, as well as composition. He composed the Tufts College alma mater.

He married Carrie Bullard on December 21, 1892, and they had one son.

Among Lewis's notable students was Alan Hovhaness. He was also instrumental in securing the acceptance of the African American composer Jester Hairston to Tufts in 1927.

Lewis died at Cambridge Hospital in Massachusetts on September 8, 1945.

The Leo Rich Lewis Memorial Scholarship, established in 1950 by classmates, former students, family, and friends in his memory, is awarded each year to a Tufts University student, with preference given to students majoring in music.
