= Guitar Concerto No. 2 (Hovhaness) =

1985 composition by Alan Hovhaness

The Guitar Concerto No. 2, Op. 394, is a concerto for classical guitar and string orchestra by the American composer Alan Hovhaness. The work was commissioned by the Spanish guitarist Narciso Yepes. It was completed in June 1985 and later premiered at the Granada Festival in 1990.

== Composition ==
The Guitar Concerto has a duration of roughly 25 minutes and is composed in four movements:

1. Andante, allegro vivace
2. Allegro giusto
3. Andante misterioso con nobilta, andante maestoso
4. Adagio, allegro giusto

== Reception ==
William Yeoman of Gramophone praised the concerto, writing, "It’s classic Hovhaness, with numerous hymn-like passages for the strings contrasted with lively pizzicato sections and fugal textures; the guitar meanwhile rejoices in puckish, modally rich dances enlivened by frequent changes of time signature and broad cantorial utterances." Music critic David Hurwitz was more critical, however, remarking, "In the concerto there is a sameness to each of its four movements that is difficult to describe, but very evident when listening. There seems to be little difference in the feeling of movement between andante and allegro; the same textures permeate each movement, as do similar modal melodies and vaguely exotic harmonies. It’s pretty, but static."

== See also ==
- List of compositions by Alan Hovhaness
