= Anne Macnaghten =

British violinist (1908–2000)

- Born: 9 August 1908; Whitwick, Leicestershire, UK
- Died: 31 December 2000 (aged 92)
- Genres: classical
- Instrument: violin

Anne Macnaghten, CBE (9 August 1908 – 31 December 2000) was a British classical violinist and pedagogue.

== Education ==
Anne was the youngest daughter of high court judge Sir Malcolm Macnaghten. She was born in Whitwick, Leicestershire, and grew up in Northern Ireland and Kensington, London. She began her violin studies at the age of six with Hungarian soloist Jelly d'Arányi. Macnaghten later stated in an interview with The Strad that d'Arányi "wasn't really a very good teacher". At the age of seventeen she travelled to Germany to study at Leipzig Conservatory (now University of Music and Theatre Leipzig) with German pedagogue Walther Davisson, who later became the director of the conservatory. She later returned to London for further study with Andre Mangeot.

== Macnaghten Concerts and String Quartet ==
In 1931 she co-founded the Macnaghten Concerts together with composer Elisabeth Lutyens and conductor Iris Lemare, which aimed to promote contemporary classical composers. The concert series was based at the Mercury Theatre, Notting Hill Gate and originally ran from 1931 to 1937.

In the same year Macnaghten founded the (then all-female) Macnaghten String Quartet, which played in many of the series' concerts. The quartet consisted of Macnaghtan, Joan Wordsell, Violet Brough and Joan Bonner. By 1932 the personnel had changed to Macnaghten, Elise Deprez, Beryl Scawen Blunt and Mary Goodchild. The quartet premièred works of several well-known composers as part of the concert series, including Sinfonietta, Op. 1 by Benjamin Britten in 1933, Tippet's String Quartet No. 1 in 1935, the String Quartet No 3 by Mary Lucas and works by Gerald Finzi, Elizabeth Maconchy, and Alan Rawsthorne.

After the war the Quartet re-formed, with Arnold Ashby as cellist. He became her second husband in 1947. The ensemble became involved in music education activities, holding a series of demonstration concerts in schools, initially in Barking (1945-7), then in Ealing (1948-53), Cambridgeshire and Hertfordshire. The Macnaghten String Quartet are still an active quartet and regularly coach chamber music at Benslow Music Trust.

== Later career ==
In 1952, with the help of composer Ralph Vaughan Williams (a strong supporter of the original concert series) and funding from the Arts Council of Great Britain (now Arts Council England), Macnaghten was able to revive the concert series, which was renamed the New Macnaghten Concerts and ran for over forty years, the last concert given in 1994. The New Macnaghten Concerts saw the première of works by British composers such as Harrison Birtwhistle and Richard Rodney Bennett.

The recital series saw performances by some of the most internationally renowned musicians of the era, including John Williams, Cecil Aronowitz, Peter Pears, Steve Reich, Michael Nyman, Derek Simpson, Thea King and many others.

Macnaghten received a Gold Medal from the Worshipful Company of Musicians in 1962, and in 1987 was appointed a CBE in recognition of her work in education.

== Personal life ==
Her first husband was James Ernest Skilbeck, an outspoken communist who fought in the Spanish Civil War against Franco. She married her second husband, cellist Arnold Ashby in 1947: he died in 1994. There was a son from her first marriage (John, born 1942) and a daughter from her second (Catherine, born 1947). Their address in the 1960s was Meadhall, Little Walden in Saffron Walden. By the late 1960s they had moved to 23 Wymondley Road, Hitchin. From the late 1970s onwards, Anne Macnaghten was teaching violin in Hertfordshire, stopping only as a result of a fall at the age of ninety. She died two years later.
