= Guitar Concerto No. 1 (Hovhaness) =

1979 composition by Alan Hovhaness

The Guitar Concerto No. 1, Op. 325, is a concerto for classical guitar and orchestra by the American composer Alan Hovhaness. The work was commissioned by the SRO Production Performing Artist Management and the Minnesota Orchestra for the guitarist Javier Calderon in July 1978. It was completed January 21, 1979, and was premiered later that summer by Calderon and the Minnesota Orchestra under conductor Leonard Slatkin.

== Composition ==
The Guitar Concerto has a duration of roughly 30 minutes and is composed in three movements:

1. Largo
2. Andante espressivo
3. Allegro moderato

The work incorporates jhala influences with traditional western harmonies.

== See also ==
- List of compositions by Alan Hovhaness
