= John Sykes (composer) =

English composer

John Austin Sykes (1909 – June 1962) was an English composer and music teacher, born in India.

== Career ==
Sykes spent his early life in India, where his father was working for the Indian Civil Service. He attended Clifton College in Bristol, studying organ under its famous one-armed organist Douglas Fox, gaining his FRCO qualification while still a schoolboy.

From 1928 he studied at Balliol College, Oxford, where he was organ scholar while studying Modern History. At Oxford he was president of the Oxford University Opera Club. A contemporary there was the poet Randall Swingler, with whom Sykes shared left-wing sympathies. (Auden, Spender, and Day Lewis were also contemporaries). In 1932 he joined The Royal College of Music, studying composition under Vaughan Williams and Gordon Jacob, with piano as a second study.

In 1936 Sykes was appointed to the staff of the Methodist Kingswood School, Bath, where he remained for the rest of his life. A pupil of his at Kingswood before the war was the left-wing historian E. P. Thompson. During the war Sykes was a conscientious objector and served in the Pioneer Corps. From 1952 he became Director of Music at Kingswood. The school now holds the John Sykes Archive.

Sykes died from cancer in the school sanatorium in June 1962.

== Composer ==
Most of Sykes' music was written either for the school or for a small group of friends – such as the identical twin sister piano duo Mary and Geraldine Peppin. Aside from two songs, a hymn and a Christmas anthem, The Child of the World (setting words by Swingler), the music remained unpublished and is now held at the John Sykes Archive, Kingswood School.

Orchestral works include a symphony, a piano concerto, a suite ("in old style") for strings and Eight Pieces for small orchestra. There is a choral Te Deum, some chamber music, over 20 scores for school theatre productions, and much piano music, choral music and song. Sykes made 36 settings of poems from William Blake's Songs of Innocence and of Experience during the 1930s and also set poems by his friend Randall Swingler. There were occasional performances beyond the school: for instance his Litanie for double chorus was performed at the Macnaghten-Lemare concert in London on 11 December 1933.

A CD of songs and piano music, including many of the Blake settings, was issued by Albion Records in 2020. Mark Padmore included his setting of Blake's 'On Another's Sorrow' in his BBC Radio 3 survey of English art song in 2022.
