= Paul Shapiro (artist) =

American painter

- Born: December 26, 1939 (age 86); Boston, Massachusetts
- Education: Northeastern University, School of the Museum of Fine Arts, Boston
- Known for: Painting
- Movement: Abstract Expressionism, Landscape painting
- Awards: New Mexico Governor's Award for Excellence in the Arts (2010)
- Website: http://www.paulshapirostudio.com/

Paul Shapiro (born 1939) is an American Abstract Expressionist and landscape painter.

New Mexican author Jon Carver writes of Shapiro's work: "Paul's interest in art and his commitment to painting is unassailable and extends to the depths of his being."

== Early life and education ==
Paul Shapiro was born in Boston, Massachusetts, on December 26, 1939. He studied at Northeastern University from 1957 to 1958 and then the School of the Museum of Fine Arts, Boston from 1959 to 1962.

== Artwork ==
In the 1960s, Shapiro was part of the Abstract Expressionist movement, but a 1970 Paris exhibition of early 20th century Expressionist painters inspired him to pursue landscape painting for the next two decades. His works were characterized by bold color and gesture. His 1982 move to Santa Fe, New Mexico, crystallized his love of landscape painting. In the 1990s, he shifted back to nonobjective abstract, but influenced of the land can still be discerned in his recent paintings.

Paul Shapiro creates visceral abstract paintings on paper and panels. His recent series, Quatumscape, is inspired by natural forces and the landscape.

Even though my work was fairly loose and abstract, I felt very confined by the envelope around recognizable forms and gravity-based relationships. In my abstract paintings, I have tried to create a concrete reality that brings an invisible world to the surface: evocative implications of a suggested parallel reality similar to what happens in poetry.

— Paul Shapiro

== Art career ==
Shapiro has exhibited internationally, throughout the United States and from Switzerland to Denmark. In 2010, he won the New Mexico Governor's Award for Excellence in the Arts.

== Selected solo exhibitions ==
- 2010: Survey Exhibition of painting, GF Contemporary, Santa Fe, New Mexico.
- 2008: Survey of Abstract Paintings 1990–2008. Zane Bennett Gallery, Santa Fe, New Mexico.

== Selected group exhibitions ==
- 2006: Art and Infinity. Santa Fe Community College, Curated by Jon Carver, Santa Fe, New Mexico.
- 1992: American Realism Figurative Painting. Cline Fine Art, Santa Fe, New Mexico.
- 1992–91: Untitled Show. Galerie Roswitha Benkert, Zurich, Switzerland.
- 1991: 'was in to art in this year, Fort Worth, Texas
- 1990,89,88: Los Angeles Art Expo, Los Angeles, California
- 1989: Art in the Embassies Program, Copenhagen, Denmark
- 1988: Golem! Danger, Deliverance & Art. The Jewish Museum, New York, New York.
