= Fantasy on Japanese Woodprints =

Concerto by Alan Hovhaness

Fantasy on Japanese Woodprints, Op. 211 (1965), is a concerto in one movement written for xylophone and orchestra by the Armenian-American composer Alan Hovhaness. The work was given its world premiere by the Chicago Symphony Orchestra, conducted by Seiji Ozawa, at the Ravinia Festival on July 4, 1965. The soloist was the Japanese virtuoso xylophonist Yoichi Hiraoka.

He wrote it while studying Oriental musical styles in Japan during his career. Much of the 15-minute work contains many themes of modal Japanese music, especially the last 3 minutes. Due to the richer and fuller sound, many soloists opt to play the solo part on marimba rather than xylophone.

The piece begins with a series of cadenzas for the soloist, all in free time (senza misura). Under each cadenza, violins and violas hold a soft chord containing many fourths and half-steps, and the basses and cellos are given a series of notes on which they are instructed to improvise until a cutoff. In between each cadenza, oboes and flutes play a dissonant glissando pattern all in free time until another cutoff.

The concerto develops into an eerie slow adagio, with shimmering chords in the string section and ending with another cadenza. A dark section in 6/8 ensues, with the xylophonist taking over and playing an extended solo completely in 32nd notes before the orchestra comes in with another free time cadenza.

The piece then launches into a march-like tempo, and the theme is completely stated by xylophone and taiko drums, with timpani playing a repeated rhythm that occurs on a different beat every time. A 6/8 dance comes back, and then a cadenza in time occurs with a flute playing the melody over the soloist. A series of loud crescendos and climaxes in free time bring the soloist into his/her final cadenza before a fast 3/4 comes in, with a fierce taiko rhythm and full orchestra build up to the end.
