= Armenian Rhapsody No. 2 =

1944 composition by Alan Hovhaness

Armenian Rhapsody No. 2, Op. 51, was composed by Alan Hovhaness in 1944 during the portion of his life when he lived near Boston and began to reconnect with his Armenian roots. Hovhaness wrote this piece during his so-called "Armenian period" from 1943 to 1951, where he was heavily influenced by not only Armenian and other Middle Eastern music but also Indian music.

These three Armenian Rhapsodies were his first efforts in using his Armenian roots "as the source of a deeper and more individual creative voice". They are the only three pieces to include actual Armenian melodies from Armenian music (songs, dances, church chants, etc.). Critics have noted that these rhapsodies "display a sense of atmosphere and a fresh approach to modal polyphony that was not present in his earlier work".

Hovhaness wrote three rhapsodies, each with an opus number that was largely uncorrelated; he had just begun attempting to order his works, and began numbering though he did not yet have a system.

== Musical influences ==
Hovhaness was influenced to write many of his pieces by nature as well as by Armenian musical tradition, especially Armenian liturgical music, which he played frequently beginning in 1942 when he was an organist at an Armenian church. His music was said to be "spiritually rooted in ancient, and often remote, mysticism".

This piece in particular was one of the few pieces where Hovhaness incorporated Armenian melodic ideas that existed in Armenian dance, liturgical, and other music. While Hovhaness did rely on the "Armenian folk idiom", his pieces remained entirely unique and original, keeping with his voice and musical style while incorporating parts of Armenian musical tradition. It was said to be still of his "own construction", rather than being directly quoted and mimicked.

Hovhaness was also influenced by Byzantine as well as Baroque ideas, using both improvisatory and fugal, canonical structures in his writing. This improvisatory, Byzantine language became known as a 'spirit murmur' in the context of Hovhaness's pieces which consisted of improvisations across instruments contained within certain scales.

== Music ==
Hovhaness's pieces were often described as "[mixing] long, melismatic lines with Baroque-inspired counterpoint", with "several rhythmic pulses going on at once, and an individual and unpredictable sense of harmony". Armenian Rhapsody No. 2 uses similar styles. Critics have described the piece as one that "develops into a series of at first decidedly un-nationalist fugues", with more typical classical natural minor scales used. Hovhaness then introduces Armenian motifs on top of those un-Armenian sounds, and critics note that "the Armenian influences eventually come to dominate the music before it stops rather abruptly".

This rhapsody represents Hovhaness trying to get back to his Armenian roots through the basis of traditional Armenian songs. The composition is similar in style to Enescu and the musical model of Liszt in the way in draws on tradition and folk songs.

=== Techniques ===
Hovhaness used a variety of techniques in his work to create this return to Armenian roots. First, he uses counterpoint and canons and fugues to interweave the two sounds together through overlaying the two melodies and motifs he creates in his work. Next, Hovhaness uses varying rhythmic pulses and rhythmic time (duplets, triplets, etc.) to create a sense of confusion and chaos that could represent his feelings about returning to his Armenian roots after growing up in America, but it could also represent his attempt to create a sound where it is hard to tell which sound is which and if they are truly different. Though Hovhaness uses two distinctly different motifs, through the piece he overlays them and distorts them in different ways in order to create a unified sound that represents not just his return to his Armenian roots but perhaps his unification or his American and Armenian roots as well.

== Performances/recordings ==
The most popular recording of this piece is by Gil Rose and the Boston Modern Orchestra Project. This recording is said to "[surpass] all previous recordings", and is known for its impressive "recorded sound" and for its "finer contrapuntal nuances" in the set of the three Armenian Rhapsodies. The piece is also said to be one of the most rewarding pieces on the recording (as it was part of a set of multiple songs including the other two Armenian Rhapsodies as well as Exile Symphony No. 1 and Soprano Saxophone Concerto). Critics have credited the producer for not putting the rhapsodies next to each other since they are so similar.
