= Iris Lemare =

English conductor and musician

Iris Margaret Elsie Lemare (27 September 1902 – 23 April 1997) was an English conductor and musician. She was the first woman to conduct the BBC Symphony Orchestra and co-founded the Macnaghten-Lemare series of concerts which introduced the public to new works by British composers. She is considered the first British woman to work professionally as a conductor.

== Biography ==
Lemare was born in London and was the daughter of Edwin Lemare and Elsie Reith. She studied organ with George Thalben-Ball, but gave it up in favour of being a timpanist. She did, however, win the Dove Prize for her skills as an organist. In the early 1920s, she attended Bedales School and also trained at the Dalcroze Institute in Geneva. Lemare studied at the Royal College of Music under Gordon Jacob and Malcolm Sargent, from 1925 to 1929. She was supported in her career in music by Hugh Allen, who encouraged her to take elocution and warned her about what he called "an appalling barrier" to women in conducting. Lemare was rejected as a conductor for the Tunbridge Wells Orchestra because they "could not possibly employ a woman."

In 1931, Lemare, Elisabeth Lutyens and Anne Macnaghten created a series of concerts showcasing British composers. They performed 40 new works in these Macnaghten-Lemare Concerts, which featured music written by Benjamin Britten, Christian Darnton, Gerald Finzi, Luytens, Elizabeth Maconchy, Kenneth Leighton, Alan Rawsthorne, John Sykes and Michael Tippett. These series of concerts provided unknown composers with a platform and gave opportunities to young musicians. The chamber orchestra assembled by Lemare included a majority of women string players. The Musical Times wrote "There is nothing quite like these concerts in London; the concert givers get to grips with the real thing in a most delightful, unconventional way, and after an evening spent with them, one feels music is gloriously alive." The concert series took place in the Ballet Club Theatre (later known as the Mercury Theatre). When the series ran into financial trouble, Hubert Foss introduced Lemare to Robert Mayer and his wife, Dora Moulton, who supported three seasons of the Macnaghten-Lemare Concerts, although the last two seasons were known only as the Lemare Concerts after Macnaghten dropped out. In 1937, the concerts came to an end.

In 1935, she was the conductor of an opera company at Pollards. Pollards was located in Loughton at No 30 Albion Hill. The company performed an opera festival every two years between 1935 and 1939. The war ended the opera festival: Pollards was used to house refugees and the family supporting the opera, the Howards, experienced losses during World War II.

In 1937, she became the first woman to conduct the BBC Symphony Orchestra. The Musical Times wrote in 1952 that "her engagement to conduct the B.B.C. Orchestra (Section E) on 15 April 1936 aroused much attention in the Press and provoked some light controversy."

She conducted the Northern Philharmonic Orchestra in 1940 and around that time, also conducted at Oxford. In 1945, she created the Lemare Orchestra. The Lemare Orchestra featured soloists such as Geza Anda, Peter Donohoe, Joan Hammond and Benno Moiseivitsch. Lemare conducted Opera Nova from 1970 to 1984. Iris was keen to encourage local talent and she was especially fond of introducing young people to the world of opera. She knew Ruth Pennyman, who lived at Ormesby Hall, Middlesbrough. She enjoyed her parties, involving lively chatter about the arts, and also visiting the police stables there, offering sugar lumps to the horses, which was indicative of her love of animals. In her later years, she lectured and worked as a judge and examiner. She died in Askham Bryan on 23 April 1997. Her remains were cremated.
