= Symphony No. 2 (Hovhaness) =

20th-century symphony by Alan Hovhaness

Symphony No. 2, Op. 132, Mysterious Mountain is a three-movement orchestral composition by the Armenian-American composer Alan Hovhaness. The symphony was commissioned by the conductor Leopold Stokowski and the Houston Symphony, and premiered live on NBC television in October 1955 on the Houston Symphony's first program with Stokowski as conductor. The first and most popular recording of the work, released in 1958 with the Chicago Symphony Orchestra performing under Fritz Reiner, is often regarded as the foremost performance of the piece. This recording, like early performances of the work, predates the composer's decision to categorize the work "symphony". Later on, the G. Schirmer published score was titled Mysterious Mountain with "Symphony No. 2" printed as a subtitle in smaller typeface.

== Style and composition ==
=== Instrumentation ===
The symphony is scored for three flutes, two oboes and English horn, two B♭ clarinets and bass clarinet, two bassoons and contrabassoon, five horns, three B♭ trumpets, three trombones, tuba, timpani, celesta, harp, and strings.

=== Structure ===
The symphony has a duration of roughly 17 minutes and is composed in three movements:

1. Andante con moto
2. Double Fugue (Moderato maestoso, allegro vivo)
3. Andante espressivo

The composition blends elements of consonant Western hymns, pentatonicism, and polyphonicism reminiscent of Renaissance music. The second movement also contains a reworking of ideas from Hovhaness's 1936 String Quartet No. 1.

=== Opus number ===
In a 1981 conversation with Charles Amirkhanian, Hovhaness detailed the rather haphazard way Mysterious Mountain acquired its opus number, recalling:

[Stokowski] called me up many times and talked to me about various things he wanted me to write and he said, 'Does it have an opus number? People like opus numbers. You know how dumb they are.' So I said, 'No, it doesn't have an opus number. I haven't catalogued my work.' 'Well how would 132'—or something like that, I think—'how would that be, do you think that gives you enough room for the things you've written?' And I said, 'Sure, that’s okay. I’ll start making a catalogue.' And he said, 'I like your titles, give it a title.' And so I gave it the title, Mysterious Mountain. Which I felt was mysterious enough.

== Reception ==
=== Critical response ===
Contemporary critical reception to Mysterious Mountain was positive and it remains one of Hovhaness's most popular works. In 1995, Lawrence Johnson of the Chicago Tribune said the symphony "still amazes today" and that it "anticipated by nearly 40 years the spiritual, meditative quasi-minimalism of composers such as Pärt, Tavener and Górecki." Edward Greenfield of Gramophone noted similarities in the piece to the music of Ralph Vaughan Williams and favorably commented, "'Mountains are symbols, like pyramids, of man's attempt to know God', says the composer, and his spiritual purpose is expressed in the modal writing of the Andante outer movements, with overtones of Vaughan Williams pastoral as well as of Tallis, framing a central fugue characteristically smooth in its lines. The finale, at the start sounding like 'Tallis Fantasia meets Parsifal', culminates in a chorale leading to a grandiose conclusion."

Not all early reports were uncritically enthusiastic, however. Harold C. Schonberg, reviewing a Carnegie Hall performance by Leopold Stokowski (on which Hovhaness's symphony shared the bill with the U.S. premiere of Vaughan Williams's Ninth Symphony, as well as works by Riegger and Orrego-Salas), pronounced Mysterious Mountain "well-made and full of delicate sounds", but found it "a not too convincing fusion of his Byzantine with Western elements".

=== Hovhaness's opinion ===
Despite the popular success of the symphony, Hovhaness expressed having "mixed feelings" about certain sections of the piece after its completion. In a 1987 interview, he was quoted saying:

I remember hearing celestial ballet in my head as I lay down to rest from writing the work. Later I transcribed what I heard in my sleep. After I wrote it, then heard it again in my sleep, certain versions were wrong. So I corrected it. Now I cannot bear to hear it [...] it's just certain parts move me. I go out of the hall whenever the piece is performed.

== In popular culture ==
Passages from the second movement were quoted by musician Carlos Santana in the song "Transformation Day" from his 1979 album Oneness and the third movement is cited by Stars Of The Lid as a reference for their 2007 album, And Their Refinement of the Decline. Parts of the symphony were also used to score the 2014 film The Better Angels.

== Partial discography ==
- 1958: Hovhaness: Mysterious Mountain, performed by the Chicago Symphony Orchestra, Fritz Reiner (dir.) – RCA Records.
- 1994: Hovhaness, A.: Symphony No. 2, "Mysterious Mountain" / Prayer of St. Gregory / And God Created Great Whales, performed by the Seattle Symphony, Gerard Schwarz (dir.) – Delos Records.
- 1997: The Five Sacred Trees/ Tree Line / Symphony No. 2, Op. 132 "Mysterious Mountain" / Old and Lost Rivers, performed by the London Symphony Orchestra, John Williams (dir.) – Sony Classical Records.
- 2003: Alan Hovhaness: Mysterious Mountains, performed by the Royal Liverpool Philharmonic, Gerard Schwarz (dir.) – Telarc.

== See also ==
- List of compositions by Alan Hovhaness

== Bibliography ==
- Shirodkar, Marco. "All About Mysterious Mountain". The Alan Hovhaness Website.
- Simmons, Walter (2005). Woodstra, Chris; Brennan, Gerald; Schrott, Allen (eds.). All Music Guide to Classical Music: The Definitive Guide to Classical Music. Backbeat Books. ISBN 0879308656.
- Smith, William Ander (1990). The Mystery of Leopold Stokowski. Fairleigh Dickinson University Press. ISBN 0838633625.
- Abramian, Jackie (1991). Conversations with Contemporary Armenian Artists. Amana Books. ISBN 0915597780.
- Weinstein, Norman (2009). Carlos Santana: A Biography. Greenwood Publishing Group. ISBN 978-0313354205.
