= Symphony No. 50 (Hovhaness) =

20th-century symphony by Alan Hovhaness

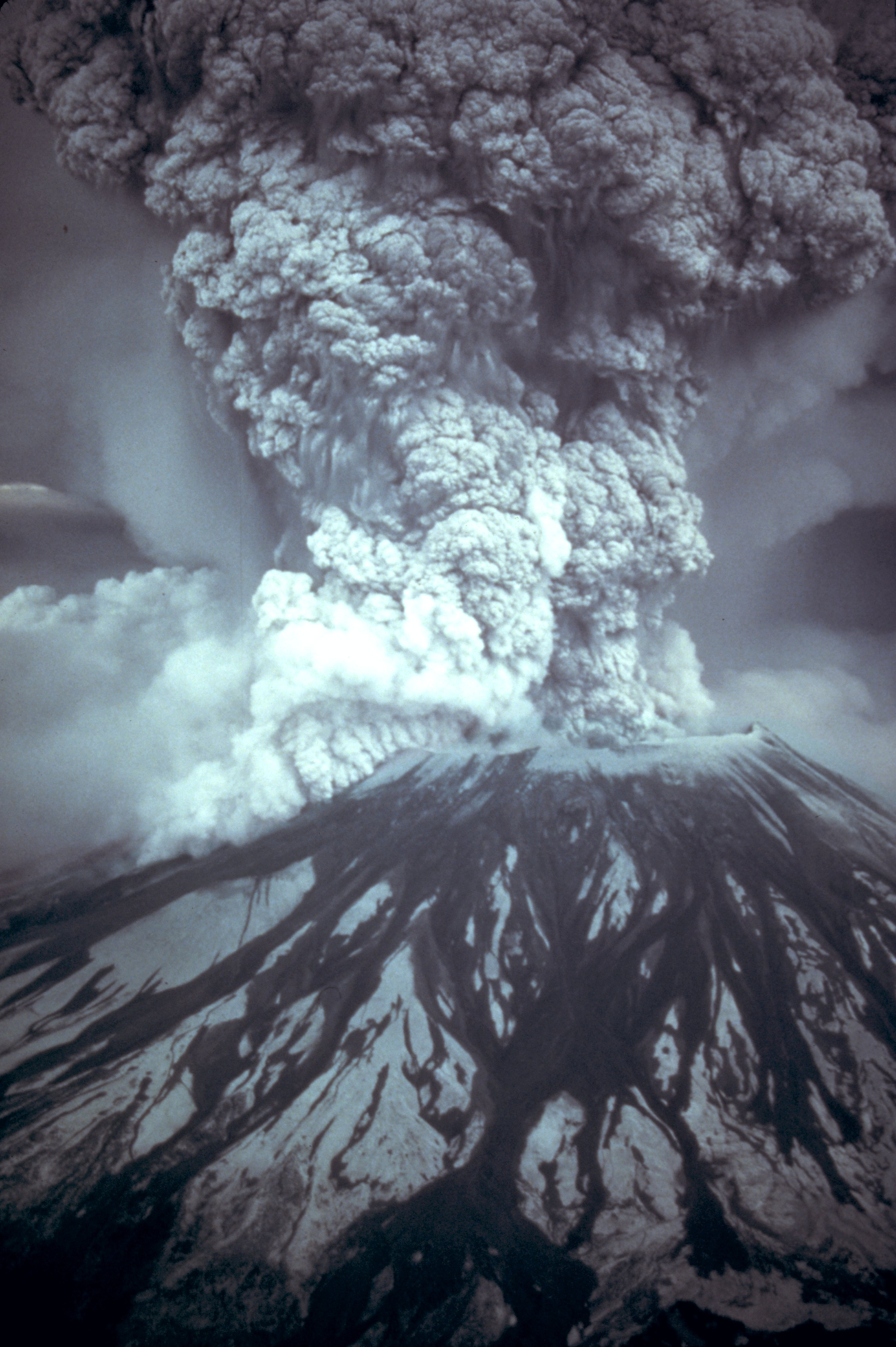
The symphony commemorates the volcano Mount St. Helens, culminating in the events of its 1980 eruption.

Symphony No. 50, Op. 360, Mount St. Helens is a three-movement orchestral composition by the American composer Alan Hovhaness. The symphony was commissioned by former Hovhaness publisher C.F. Peters and was completed January 24, 1982. It premiered March 2, 1984, and was performed by the San Jose Symphony under conductor George Cleve. The piece commemorates the volcano Mount St. Helens, culminating in the events of its 1980 eruption, which Hovhaness had witnessed from his Seattle home.

== Style and composition ==
Mount St. Helens has a duration of roughly 31 minutes and is composed in three movements:

1. Andante
2. Allegro ("Spirit Lake")
3. Adagio-Allegro ("Volcano")

Like much of Hovhaness's work, the symphony blends elements of Western music with Eastern scales and melodies.

=== Inspiration ===
In the program notes for the symphony, Hovhaness wrote:

When Mount St. Helens erupted on the morning of May 18, 1980, the sonic boom struck our south windows. Ashes did not come here at that time but covered land to the east all across the State of Washington into Montana. Ashes continued to travel all around the world, landing lightly on our house a week later, after their journey all around our planet. In my Mount St. Helens Symphony I have tried to suggest a musical tribute to the sublime grandeur and beauty of Mount St. Helens and the surrounding majestic Cascade Mountains.

== Reception ==
Herbert Glass of the Los Angeles Times lauded the work, saying, "It's wonderfully natural, even simple-sounding, music--but set on a foundation of vast skill in manipulating the orchestra and formal savvy." Andrew Achenbach of Gramophone also praised the symphony, noting "... a most beguiling lyrical impulse informs the first two movements of the Mount St Helens Symphony (No. 50) from 1983. The second, entitled 'Spirit Lake', is particularly affecting. Insistent, strangely Sibelian pizzicatos form a background against which lonely woodwind sing out their expressive runes..." Achenback added, "... the last movement, 'Volcano', erupts with a vengeance [...]. The pounding central portion achieves a frightening momentum, and Hovhaness's sense of orchestral spectacle (such as those odious, yet startlingly effective trombone glissandos from 2'48" onwards) produces some often thrilling sounds—no wonder the symphony went down so well with the public at its Seattle premiere."

Reviewing the 2003 Royal Liverpool Philharmonic recording, the music critic Andrew Farach-Colton further commented "... it’s difficult not to be entranced, and even awed, by the music’s sheer sensuous beauty – those luminous clouds of strings, that majestic rising theme in the horns, then, a little later, the delicate spinning of the harp and a procession of ecstatic, exotic woodwind solos. Perhaps the depiction of the volcano’s eruption is a bit primitive, though it’s fascinating that Hovhaness seems to view the explosion not only as an elemental event but also as a ritualistic one."

== Discography ==
- 1993: Hovhaness Symphonies, performed by the Seattle Symphony, Gerard Schwarz (dir.) - Delos Records.
- 2003: Alan Hovhaness: Mysterious Mountains, performed by the Royal Liverpool Philharmonic, Gerard Schwarz (dir.) - Telarc.

== See also ==
- List of compositions by Alan Hovhaness

== Bibliography ==
- Simmons, Walter (2005). Woodstra, Chris; Brennan, Gerald; Schrott, Allen (eds.). All Music Guide to Classical Music: The Definitive Guide to Classical Music. Backbeat Books. ISBN 0879308656.
