= Sonata in C major for piano four-hands, K. 521 =

1787 composition by Wolfgang Amadeus Mozart

Sonata in C major for piano four-hands
- by W. A. Mozart
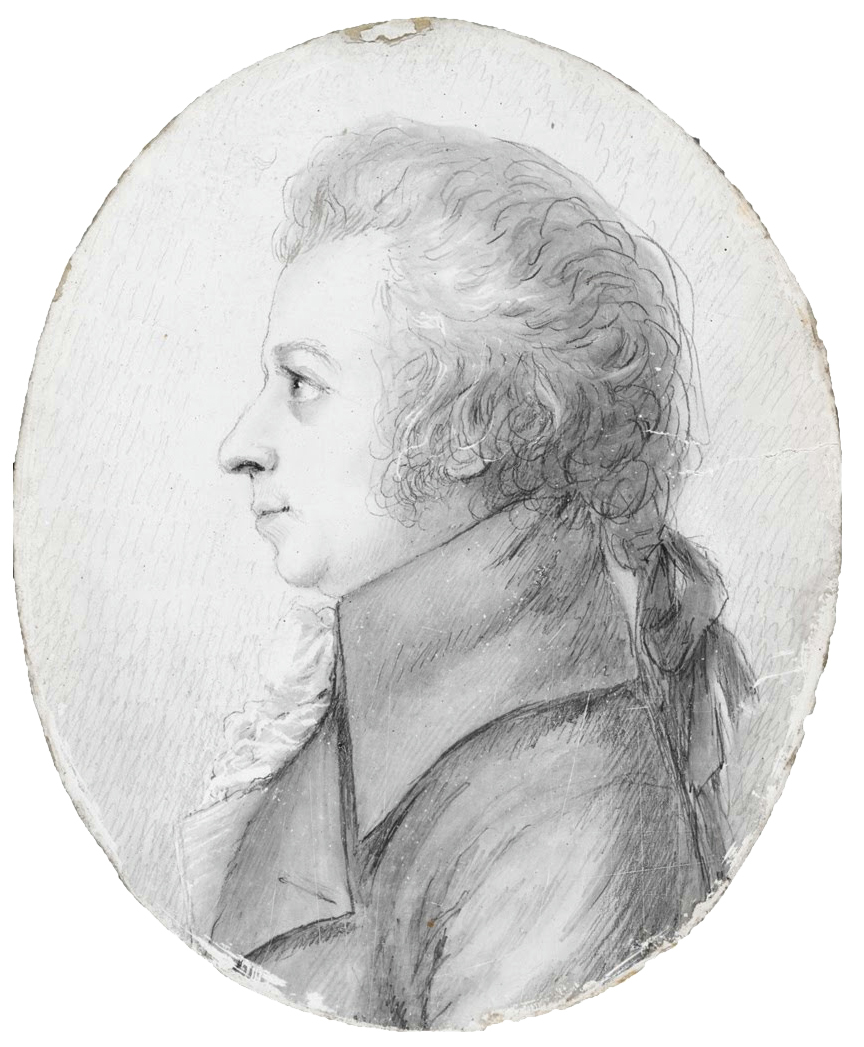
- Mozart in 1789, drawing by Dora Stock
- Key: C major
- Catalogue: K. 521
- Style: Classical period
- Composed: 1787
- Published: 1788
- Movements: Three (Allegro, Andante, Allegretto)

The Sonata in C major for piano four-hands, K. 521, is a piano sonata in three movements composed by Wolfgang Amadeus Mozart in 1787. It was his last complete piano duet sonata for one piano, four hands. This sonata consists of three movements: Allegro, Andante and Allegretto.

The autograph manuscript of the sonata is preserved in the Fitzwilliam Museum, Cambridge.

== Dedication and context ==
In Mozart's thematic catalog, the piece was dated May 29, 1787. On that same day, he also received word of his father's death. Mozart then shared the sad news with his close friend Gottfried von Jacquin, a Viennese court official and amateur musician, and subsequently dedicated the piece to Gottfried's sister, Franziska von Jacquin. In Mozart's letter to Gottfried, he noted that the piece is "rather difficult" and therefore instructed Franziska to "tackle it at once".

This piece was published at the turn of the year 1787/1788 by music publisher Franz Anton Hoffmeister. Instead of Mozart's original intention to dedicate it to Franziska von Jacquin, one of his most talented pupils, it was dedicated to Nanette and Barbette Natrop, daughters of Viennese businessman Franz Wilhelm Natorp, also in the Jacquin circle.

== Movements ==
=== I. Allegro (C major) ===
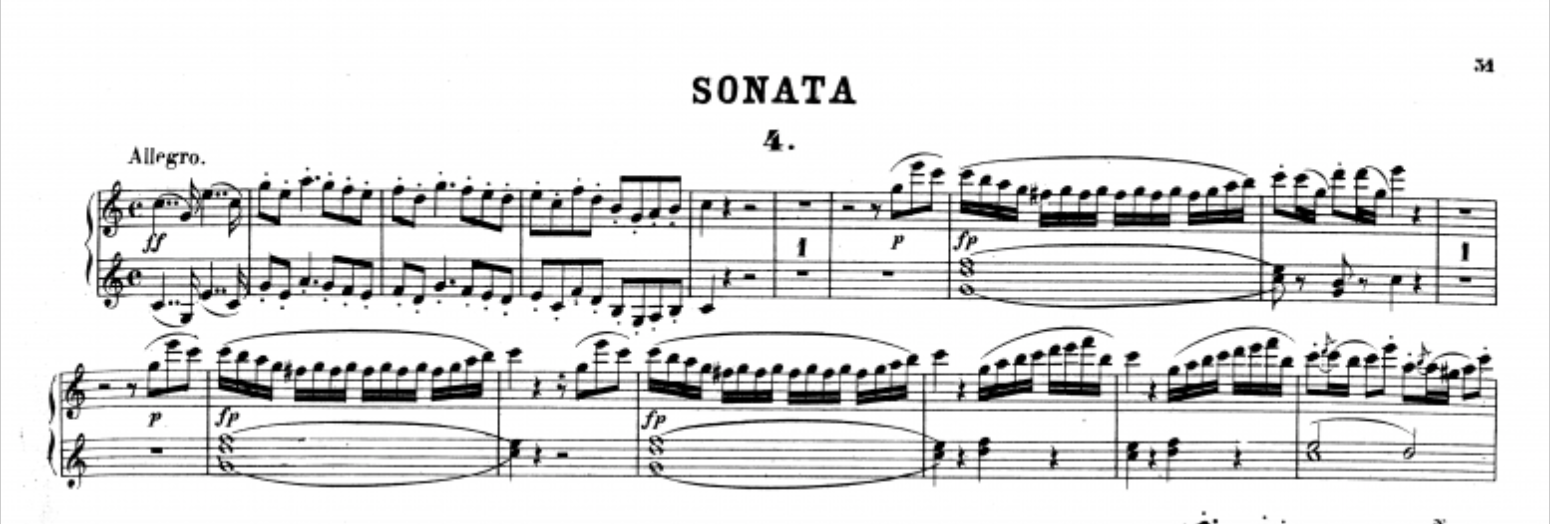
Opening measures of Primo

The first movement begins with the Primo and Secondo parts playing in unison, presenting the main theme with both vigor and delicacy. After the initial phrase, follows a tasteful and refined dialog between Primo and Secondo. A gracious second theme comes after the sixteenth note descending scales and a slight pause at the end of the first theme.

=== II. Andante (F major) ===
This slow and melancholic second movement takes a ternary form of A–B–A. The outer sections (A sections) bear a lyrical and gentle quality, while the middle section (B section) has difficult triplets runs that give a rather tense feeling.

=== III. Allegretto (C major) ===
The third movement is a rondo. Its main theme begins with a relaxed "music-box naivety" full of glamour and humor.

== Notable performances ==
Notable performances include those of Martha Argerich and Evgeny Kissin, The Latsos Piano Duo, Ingrid Haebler and Ludwig Hoffmann

Recordings on historical keyboards include:

- Malcolm Frager, Robert Levin. Mozart. Works for Two Claviers. Label: ORF, 1991. Fortepianos by Anton Walter from c. 1780 (Mozart's own) and c. 1790.
- George Malcolm, András Schiff. Mozart. Piano Music for 4 Hands. Label: London, 1993. Fortepiano by Walter (Mozart's own).
- Arthur Schoonderwoerd, Miklós Spányi. Mozart. Une soirée chez les Jacquin. Label: Zig-Zag Territoires. Fortepiano by Christopher Clarke (1992) after Sebastian Lengerer (Kupstein, 1793).
- Bart van Oort, Ursula Dütschler. Mozart. Label: Brilliant Classics, 2001. Fortepiano by Chris Maene (Ruiselede, 2000) after Walter (c. 1795).
- Wolfgang Glüxam, Patrick Ayrton. Mozart. Sonates à quatre mains pour Clavecin. Label: ORF. Franco-Flemish harpsichord by Willem Kroesbergen (Utrecht, 1986).
- Yoshio Watanabe, Akiko Sakikawa. Mozart. Label: ALM Records, 2007. Fortepiano by Johann Andreas Stein (Augsburg, 1788).
- Marie Kuijken, Veronica Kuijken. Mozart. Sonatas for Four Hands. Label: Challenge Classics, 2009. Fortepiano by Claude Kelecom after Stein.
- Julian Perkins, Emma Abbate. Mozart. Piano Duets, Volume 1.Label: Resonus Classics, 2015. Fortepiano by Johann Peter Fritz (Vienna, c. 1815).
