= 1828 in music =

This article is about music-related events in 1828.

== Events ==
- January 14 & December 30 – Franz Schubert's song cycle Winterreise is published, the second part posthumously.
- February 29 – Daniel Auber's La muette de Portici ("Masaniello"), the earliest French grand opera, premières at the Salle Le Peletier of the Paris Opéra.
- March 9 – The Orchestre de la Société des Concerts du Conservatoire of Paris gives its first concert, including music by Beethoven, Rossini, Meifreid, Rode and Cherubini.
- March 26 – Franz Schubert gives his only public concert of his own works eight months before his death aged 31 in Vienna of typhoid fever or symptoms related to syphilis.
- August – Genoa-born violinist Niccolò Paganini begins his European tour in Vienna. It establishes his international reputation as the greatest violinist of his time and inspires other instrumentalists to mimic his innovations on the piano (Chopin, Liszt).
- November 3 – Composer Ferdinand Hérold is awarded the Légion d'honneur.
- December 14 – Franz Schubert's Symphony No. 6 (written 1817–18) receives its first performance, posthumously, in Vienna by the Gesellschaft der Musikfreunde.
- December 27 – Soprano Elisabetta Manfredini-Guarmani gives her last known performance, at Rimini. She disappears from the historical record after this.
- Flugelhorn introduced by Heinrich Stölzel in Berlin.

== Popular music ==
- "Oh! No! We Never Mention Her" by Thomas Haynes Bayly & E. Riley
- "Tyrolese Evening Hymn" by Felicia Hemans & Augusta Browne
- "Jump Jim Crow" by Thomas D. Rice

== Classical music ==
- Hector Berlioz – Waverly Overture, Op. 1
- Frédéric Chopin
  - Piano Sonata No. 1 Op. 4
  - Fantasy on Polish Airs Op. 13
  - Rondo à la Krakowiak Op. 14
- Johannes Frederik Fröhlich – Ouverture til Freias Alter
- Mikhail Glinka – Mazurka in G major
- Ferdinand Hérold – La fille mal gardée (ballet)
- Franz Schubert
  - Der Hirt auf dem Felsen
  - Fantasia in F minor for piano four-hands
  - Mass no. 6 in E-flat major
  - String Quintet in C major, D. 956
  - Schwanengesang
  - Last three piano sonatas
- Louis Spohr – Symphony No. 3, Op. 78

== Opera ==
- Daniel Auber – La muette de Portici
- Vincenzo Bellini – Bianca e Fernando
- Gaetano Donizetti – L'esule di Roma
- Heinrich Marschner – Der Vampyr
- Gioacchino Rossini – Le comte Ory (Count Ory) first performed in Paris. Libretto by Eugène Scribe and Charles-Gaspard Delestre-Poirson.
- Peter Josef von Lindpaintner – Der Vampyr
- Saverio Mercadante – Adriano in Siria (Ita) and Gabriella di Vergy (Ita)

== Publications ==
- Louis-Francois Dauprat – Du cor à pistons
- Edward Holmes – A Ramble Among the Musicians of Germany
- Johann Bernard Logier – System der Musikwissenschaft (abridged version, full version published one year earlier)
- Gustav Adolph Wettengel – Vollständiges Lehrbuch der Geigen- und Bogenmacherkunst
- Carl Friedrich Whistling – Handbuch der musikalischen Literatur

== Births ==
- January 6 – Robert Keller, music editor (d. 1891)
- January 17 – Ede Reményi, violinist (d. 1898)
- January 20 – Johanna Sundberg, ballerina (d. 1910)
- February 8 – Antonio Cagnoni, composer (d. 1896)
- 14 February – Julius Reisinger, choreographer (d. 1892)
- April 5 – Pietro Platania, composer and music teacher (d. 1907)
- April 15 – Robert Sands, first conductor of the Mormon Tabernacle Choir
- April 24 – Charles Nuitter, librettist (died 1899)
- April 26 – Francesco Graziani (baritone), operatic baritone (d. 1901)
- June 2 – James Cutler Dunn Parker, composer (d. 1916)
- June 24 – Adolphe Blanc, chamber music composer (d. 1885)
- July 15 – Raffaele Fiorini, violin maker (d. 1898)
- July 31 – François-Auguste Gevaert, musicologist and composer (d. 1908)
- August 5 – Giovanni Rossi, composer, conductor, organist, and conservatory director (died 1886)
- August 7 – Michał Zawadzki, composer (died 1887)
- October 3 – Woldemar Bargiel, composer (d. 1897)
- October 19 – Adolfo Fumagalli, pianist (d. 1856)
- November 3 – Joseph Hellmesberger, Sr., violinist and conductor (d. 1893)
- November 10 – Hector-Jonathan Crémieux, librettist (d. 1892)
- November 23 – Clemente Aguirre, composer and music teacher (d. 1900)
- December 23 – Mathilde Wesendonck, poet and collaborator of Richard Wagner (d. 1902)

== Deaths ==
- January 12 – Peter Mandrup Lem, violinist (b. 1758)
- March 26 – Elisabeth Olin, operatic soprano (b. 1740)
- April 25 – François Benoît Hoffmann, opera librettist (b. 1760)
- July 9 – Cathinka Buchwieser, German opera singer and actress (b.1789)
- July 22 or July 28 – Antonio Calegari, composer (b. 1757)
- September 25 – Charlotta Seuerling, singer, harpsichordist, composer and poet (b. c. 1783)
- October 31 – John Marsh, composer (b. 1752)
- November 19 – Franz Schubert, composer (b. 1797)
- December 30 – Waldemar Thrane, composer (b. 1790)
- date unknown – Vincenzo dal Prato, castrato singer (b. 1756)
