= Allegro Brillant (Mendelssohn) =

Allegro Brillant, Op. 92
Performed live by The Latsos Piano Duo (Giorgi Latso & Anna Fedorova-Latso) in Greystone Mansion, Beverly Hills (2019)

Allegro Brillant, Op. 92, MWV T 4 is a composition written for Piano four hands by Felix Mendelssohn consisting of a theme in A major, written in 1841 and dedicated to Clara Schumann.

The expressive Andante theme alternates between the Secondo and Primo, segueing into the virtuosic Allegro assai vivace movement with a rush of scales. All fingering, metronome marks, and notational omissions have been supplemented by the editors. Allegro brillant is considered one of the most challenging pieces in the entire piano duet repertoire.
