= Three Marches Militaires (Schubert) =

A set of three marches for piano four-hands by Schubert

- by Franz Schubert
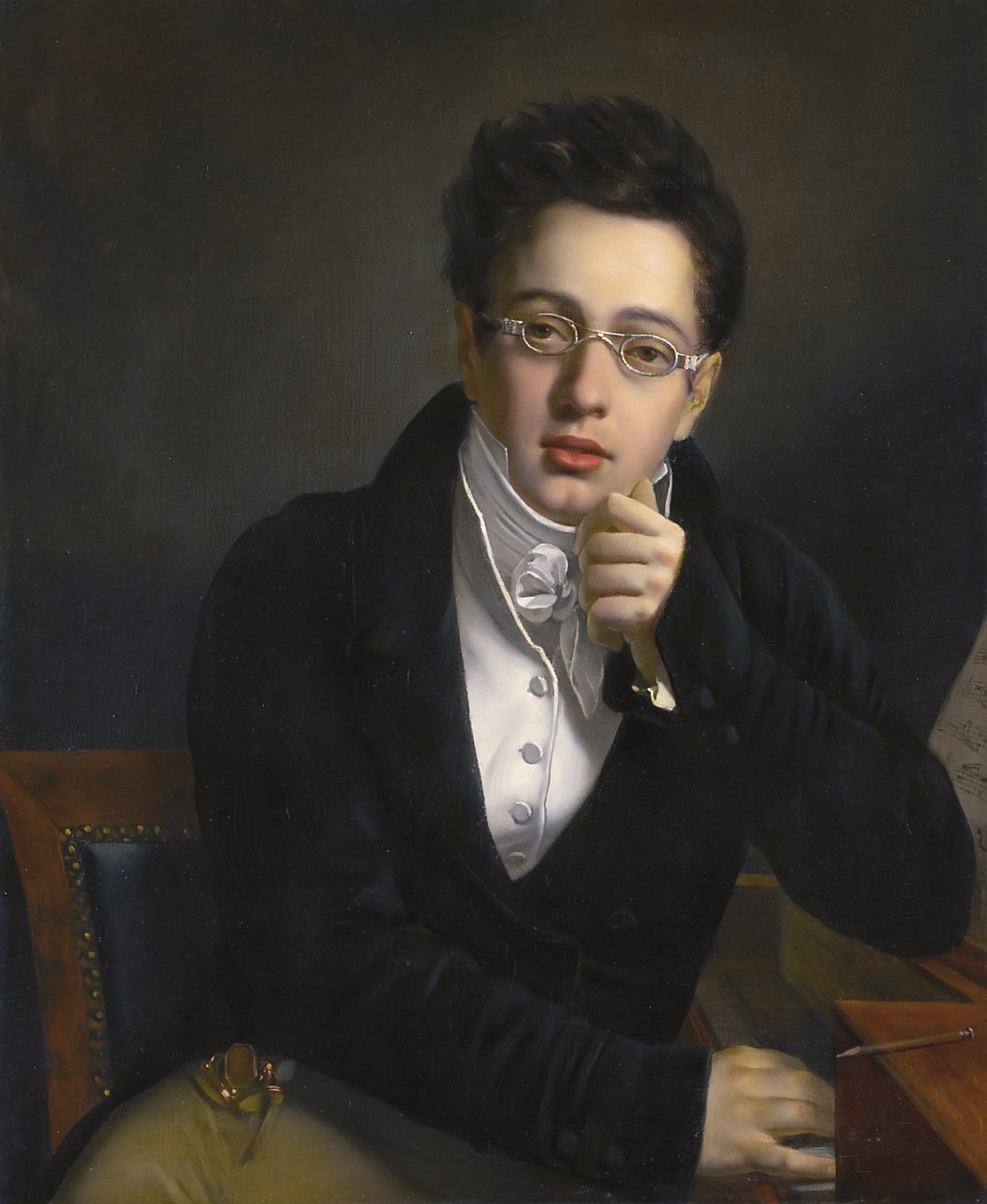
- Possible portrait of the young Franz Schubert c. 1814, attributed to Josef Abel
- Catalogue: D. 733
- Composed: c. 1812–1824
- Published: 7 August 1826: Vienna, Austria

The Three Marches Militaires, Op. 51, D. 733, are pieces in march form written for piano four-hands by Franz Schubert.

The first of the three is far more famous than the others. It is one of Schubert's most famous compositions, and it is often simply referred to as "Schubert's Marche militaire".

== Background ==
It is not certain when the Marches militaires were written: many scholars favour 1818 but some prefer alternative dates such as 1822 or 1824. It is known that they were written during Schubert's stay at Count Johann Karl Esterházy's summer home in Zseliz in Hungary (now Želiezovce in Slovakia). He had accepted a job there as music teacher to the Count's daughters, Maria Theresia and Caroline, and these and similar works were written for instructional purposes.

The Marches militaires were published in Vienna on 7 August 1826, as Op. 51, by Anton Diabelli.

They are all in ternary form, with a central trio leading to a reprise of the main march.

== March No. 1 in D major ==
Marche Militaire No. 1

- Allegro vivace, in D major; the trio is in G major
- This march is one of Schubert's most famous melodies, and it has been arranged for full orchestra, military bands, and many different combinations of instruments.
- It has been quoted in various other works, including Igor Stravinsky's Circus Polka, and even in Walt Disney's animated short Santa's Workshop.
  - A jazzed-up version of the melody was also used during the scene where Mickey Mouse marches with the cards in another animated short film from Walt Disney in 1936, "Thru the Mirror".
- Franz Liszt paraphrased March No. 1 for solo piano as Grand paraphrase de concert, S.426a.
- Carl Tausig also wrote a version for solo piano, in D-flat major, which has been recorded by pianists such as Vladimir Horowitz, Evgeny Kissin, Josef Hofmann, György Cziffra, Alicia de Larrocha and Leopold Godowsky.

=== In popular culture ===
- This march was used as theme music by the Autolite company to promote its products, notably in a 1940 promotional film produced by the Jam Handy organization, famous for its closing sequence, which featured stop motion animation of the products marching past Autolite factories. An abbreviated version of this sequence was later used in television ads for Autolite, especially those on the 1950s CBS program Suspense, which Autolite sponsored.
- An arrangement for accordion was played as theme music for BBC Radio 4's 1982 dramatization of A Small Town in Germany by John le Carré.
- This march is remixed for the Ricoh 2A03 and used as Drill Man's stage theme in the ROM hack Rockman 4 Minus Infinity.
- An excerpt of this song is featured as a background music in the 1985 video game Challenger.
- The march is used in the GCE Ordinary Level (United Kingdom) for the Listening Comprehension portion of the examination.
- The composition appears in the 1932 short film Santa's Workshop and there are also Christmas lyrics in Swedish, as "Önskelistan" ("the Wishlist") written by Gunlis Österberg, also known as "Vi vill ha skridskor, en häst och en rymdraket" ("We want iceskates, a horse and a rocket-spacecraft").

== Marches Nos. 2 and 3 ==
- March No. 2 in G major, Allegro molto moderato
- March No. 3 in E♭ major, Allegro moderato

== Recordings ==
Recordings of the original piano 4-hand version include those by Christoph Eschenbach and Justus Frantz; Radu Lupu and Daniel Barenboim; Robert Levin and Malcolm Bilson; Evgeny Kissin and James Levine; and Artur Schnabel and Karl Ulrich Schnabel.
