= Fantasia in F minor (Schubert) =

Composition by Franz Schubert

Fantasia
- by Franz Schubert
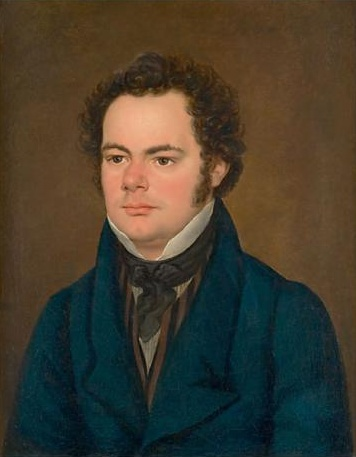
- Schubert in 1827 (portrait by Anton Depauly from 1828)
- Key: F minor
- Catalogue: D. 940
- Opus: 103
- Composed: 1828
- Dedication: Caroline Esterházy (found in posthumously published version, not in autograph)
- Published: March 1829
- Publisher: Anton Diabelli
- Duration: c. 20 minutes
- Movements: 4
- Scoring: Piano four hands

The Fantasia in F minor by Franz Schubert, D. 940 (Op. posth. 103), for piano four hands (two players at one piano), is one of his most important works for more than one pianist and one of his most important piano works altogether. He composed it in 1828, the last year of his life. A dedication to his former pupil Caroline Esterházy can be found only in the posthumous first edition, not in Schubert's autograph.

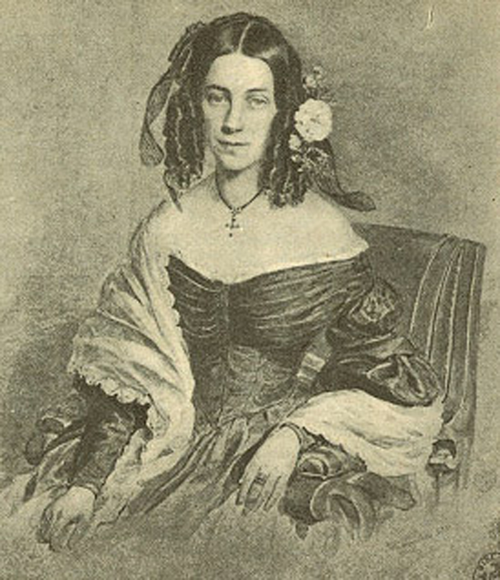
Caroline Esterházy

Specifically including the Fantasia in F minor, musicologist Christopher Gibbs has written, "Schubert's music for piano duets is among not only his greatest but also his most original".

== History ==
Franz Schubert began writing the Fantasia in January 1828 in Vienna. The work was completed in March of that year, and first performed in May. Schubert's friend Eduard von Bauernfeld recorded in his diary on May 9 that a memorable duet was played, by Schubert and Franz Lachner. The work was dedicated to Caroline Esterházy, with whom Schubert was in (unrequited) love.

Schubert died in November 1828. After his death, his friends and family undertook to have a number of his works published. This work is one of those pieces; it was published by Anton Diabelli in March 1829. The original manuscript resides at the Austrian National Library.

== Structure ==
"Fantasia in F minor"
The Latsos Piano Duo (Giorgi Latso and Anna Latso) perform Franz Schubert's piano four hands Fantasia in F minor, at historic Greystone Mansion in Beverly Hills, California. (Live recording April 13, 2019)

The Fantasia is divided into four movements, which are interconnected and played without pause.

1. Allegro molto moderato
2. Largo
3. Scherzo. Allegro vivace
4. Finale. Allegro molto moderato

A typical performance lasts about 20 minutes.

The basic idea of a fantasia with four connected movements also appears in Schubert's Wanderer Fantasy, and represents a stylistic bridge between the traditional sonata form and the essentially free-form tone poem. The basic structure of the two fantasies is essentially the same: allegro, slow movement, scherzo, allegro with fugue. The form of this work, with its relatively tight structure (more so than the fantasias of Beethoven and Mozart), was influential on the work of Franz Liszt, who arranged the Wanderer Fantasy as a piano concerto, among other transcriptions he made of Schubert's music.

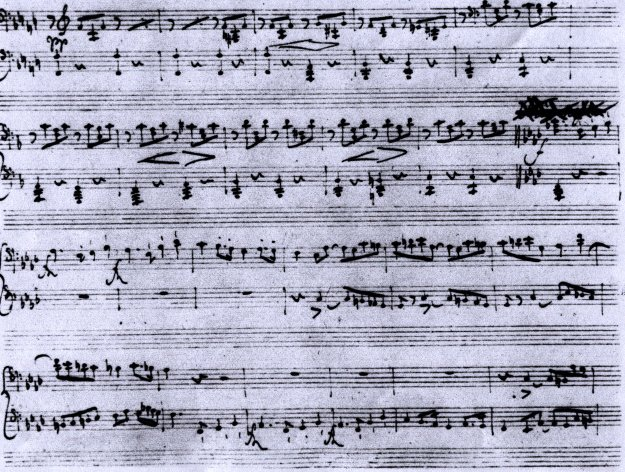
A page from the autograph manuscript, showing a portion of the secondo (left-side) part from the fourth movement

=== I. Allegro molto moderato ===
The piece opens with a lyrical melody with dotted rhythms that is reminiscent of the Hungarian style. The theme is eventually repeated in F major, before briefly repeating in F minor, and transitioning into a somber, almost funereal, second theme. After developing the two themes, he eventually returns to a version of the second theme in F major, which modulates into F♯ minor for the start of the second movement.

=== II. Largo ===
The second movement opens with an angry, somewhat turbulent fortissimo theme in F♯ minor. While marked largo, the frequently double-dotted first theme lends a great deal of tension to this movement. Eventually the first theme gives way to a quiet, lyrical second theme. The first theme is reprised, ending on the C♯ major dominant. Schubert had recently heard Paganini's second violin concerto, whose second movement inspired the themes here.

=== III. Scherzo. Allegro vivace ===
Following the F♯ minor, agitated second movement, the third movement scherzo is a bright, lively movement in the same key, reminiscent of the scherzos of other works Schubert wrote at this time, like those of his piano trios. After a delicate D major trio, the scherzo returns, at first seemingly in F♯ minor. The repeat of the scherzo shifts between A major and F♯ minor, ultimately ending on C♯ octaves that drive into a transition back toward F minor for the finale.

=== IV. Finale. Allegro molto moderato ===
The finale begins with a restatement of the first movement's primary theme in both F minor and F major, before transitioning into a fugue based on its second theme. The fugue builds to a climax, ending abruptly on the C major dominant, instead of resolving into either F major or minor. After a bar of silence, the first theme briefly reprises, building rapidly to concluding chords that echo the second theme before subsiding into a quiet end. It has been called "the most remarkable cadence in the whole of Schubert's work", as he manages to condense the dichotomies of the two themes into the final eight bars of the work.

== Transcriptions ==
In 1961, Russian composer Dimitri Kabalevsky orchestrated the work, producing a virtuoso piece for one piano soloist playing with a symphony orchestra.

== Recordings ==
The fantasy has been recorded numerous times, including by the following notable performers:

- Alfred Brendel with Évelyne Crochet on Vox Box
- Sviatoslav Richter and Benjamin Britten on Decca Records/BBC Legends
- Evgeny Kissin and James Levine on RCA Victor
- Katia and Marielle Labèque on Kml Recordings
- Bracha Eden and Alexander Tamir on Brilliant Classics
- Justus Frantz and Christoph Eschenbach on EMI
- Radu Lupu and Murray Perahia, and Duo Tal & Groethuysen on Sony Classical
- Evgeni Koroliov and Ljupka Hadzigeorgieva on Tacet
- Aloys and Alfons Kontarsky, Emil and Elena Gilels, Maria João Pires with Ricardo Castro, Lucas and Arthur Jussen, and Maurizio and Daniele Pollini on Deutsche Grammophon
- Jörg Demus and Paul Badura-Skoda several times, including on Westminster, Auvidis Valois, and Audax
- Vitya Vronsky and Victor Babin on US Decca
- Robert and Gaby Casadesus on Columbia Masterworks
- Pavel Kolesnikov and Samson Tsoy on Harmonia Mundi
- Alexandre Tharaud and Zhu Xiao-Mei on Harmonia Mundi Fr
- The Latsos Piano Duo (Giorgi Latso and Anna Fedorova- Latso) for BHNT
- Emil Gilels and Orchestra Sinfonica Di Milano della RAI, conducted by Franco Caracciolo, for Archipel Records. Live recording of the Schubert-Kabalevsky orchestrated version. ("Emil Gilels in Italy")
- Michael Korstick and NDR Sinfonieorchester, conducted by Alun Francis, for Chandos Records. Studio recording of the Schubert-Kabalevsky orchestrated version
- Sergio Tiempo and Martha Argerich for Avanticlassic

Recordings on 19th century pianos include the followings:

Pianists	Fortepiano	Label
Jos van Immerseel and Claire Chevallier	Conrad Graf (1826)	Alpha
Nicolas Callot and Lucas Blondeel	Conrad Graf (1826)	Klara
Malcolm Bilson and Robert D. Levin	Conrad Graf (c. 1830)	Archive
Andreas Staier & Alexander Melnikov	Christopher Clarke (Maître d'art) after Graf	Harmonia Mundi
Inge Spinette and Jan Michiels	R. J. Regier (1989) after Conrad Graf (1828)	
Wyneke Jordans and Leo van Doeselaar	Friedrich Hoxa (c. 1826)	Globe
Jan Vermeulen and Veerle Peeters	Johann Nepomuk Tröndlin (1830-1835)	Etcetera
Richard Egarr and Alexandra Nepomnyashchaya	Pleyel (1848)	Linn Records
Seth Carlin and Maryse Carlin		Naiad Records
