= Op. 92 =

In music, Op. 92 stands for Opus number 92. Compositions that are assigned this number include:

- Beethoven – Symphony No. 7
- Britten – A Birthday Hansel
- Dvořák – Carnival Overture
- Mendelssohn – Allegro Brillant
- Prokofiev – String Quartet No. 2
- Saint-Saëns – Piano Trio No. 2
- Schumann – Introduction and Allegro appassionato
- Shostakovich – String Quartet No. 5
- Sibelius – My Own Land (Oma maa), cantata for mixed choir and orchestra (1918)
