= Gal Rasché =

Austrian-Russian pianist, music teacher and conductor

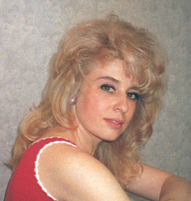

Background information
- Birth name: Galina Viktorovna Krutikova
- Born: 13 March 1960 (age 65)
- Origin: Saint-Petersburg, Russia
- Genres: Classical music
- Occupation(s): pianist, conductor, lecturer, professor
- Instrument: Piano
- Years active: 1991–present
- Website: www.galrasche.com

Galina Mauracher (born 13 March 1960 as Galina Viktorovna Krutikova, Russian: Галина Викторовна Крутикова in Leningrad), known professionally as Gal Rasché, is a Russian-Austrian pianist, music teacher and conductor.

== Biography ==
Rasché is daughter of Viktor Krutikov (1930-1996), the longtime head of the Krasny Bor transmitter and Honored Communications Technician of the RSFSR and Valentina Krutikova (1930-2020).

Gal Rasché studied conducting at the St. Petersburg Conservatory. As a conductor, she performed works by Mozart, Schubert, Haydn and Tchaikovsky in concerts with the Viennarmonica Orchestra and the Vienna Metropolitan Chamber Orchestra in the Wiener Konzerthaus and in the Great Hall of the Musikverein.

Rasché was a prizewinner of the international artist competition Duc de Richelieu in the category author's book and musical original composition and interpretation in 2015 and 2018. She is a member of the RAO (Russian Authors' Society).

In 1996 she wrote the scenario for the ballet based on Anatoly Ivanov's transcription of the "Children's Album" by Pyotr Ilyich Tchaikovsky for percussion ensemble for which she won an award at the international festival in Yugoslavia.

She also held professorship for piano from 1998 - 2020 at the Prayner Conservatory in Vienna.
