= The Shepherd on the Rock =

Composition by Franz Schubert, 1828

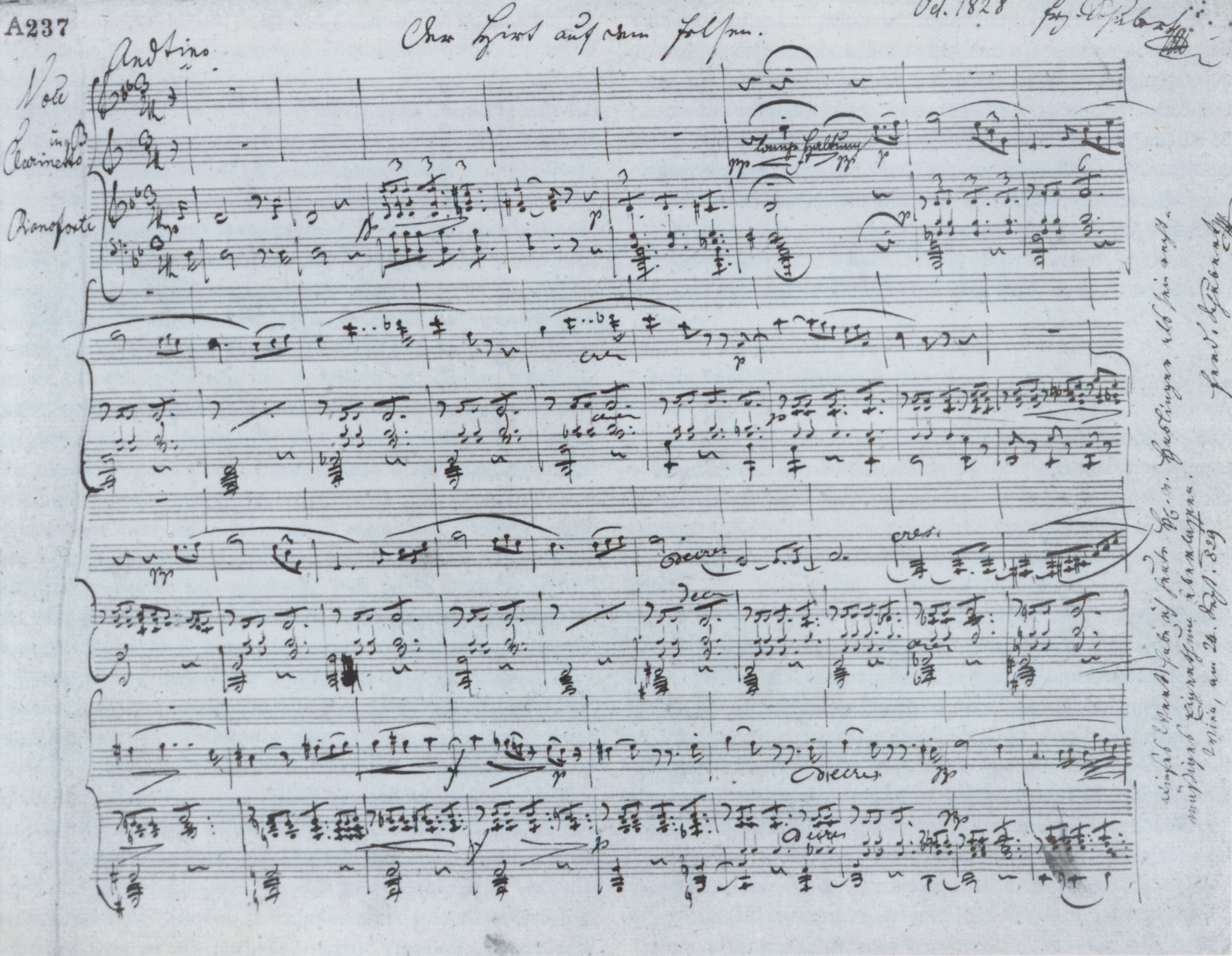
"The Shepherd on the Rock", Schubert's autograph

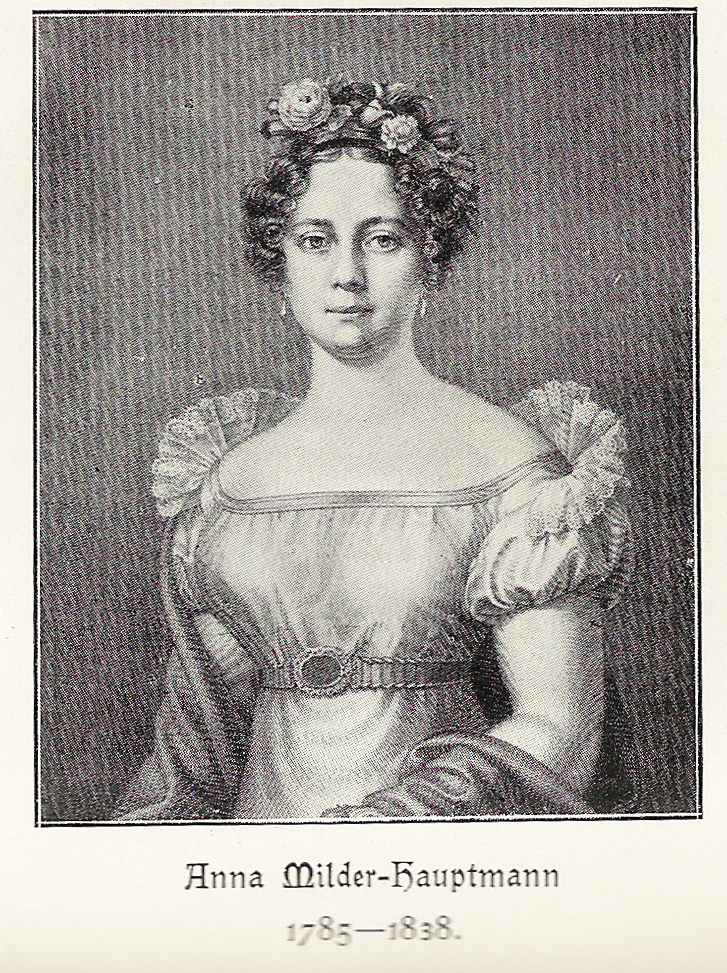
Anna Milder-Hauptmann

"The Shepherd on the Rock" (German: Der Hirt auf dem Felsen), D. 965, is a Lied for soprano, clarinet, and piano by Franz Schubert. It was composed in 1828 during the final months of his life.

== Lyrics ==
Of the seven verses, the first four and the last came from the poetry of Wilhelm Müller, while verses five and six were attributed to Helmina von Chézy but were written by Karl August Varnhagen von Ense.

== Background ==
The lied, Schubert's penultimate composition, was written as a belated response to a request from the operatic soprano Anna Milder-Hauptmann, a friend of Schubert. She had requested a show-piece that would allow her to express a wide range of feelings, and he wrote it as thanks for her attempts to stage one of his operas in Berlin. She received a copy of the score from Schubert's brother Ferdinand in September 1829, and the work was published a year and a half after Schubert's death. Milder sang it for the first time at the House of the Blackheads in Riga on 10 February 1830.

== Structure ==
The lied has three sections, with clarinet and voice equally challenged. The first, in B♭ major, is warm, as the lonely shepherd on the mountaintop listens to echoes rising from below. The second section grows dark as he expresses grief and loneliness; it starts in G minor, then modulates through A♭ major and A minor to G major. The short last section, returning to B♭ major, anticipates the coming of spring and, with it, rebirth.

== Complete text ==
"Der Hirt auf dem Felsen"
Montserrat Alavedra (soprano), William McColl (ca. 1820 clarinet), Joseph Levine (fortepiano)

Wilhelm Müller – "Der Berghirt" (The Mountain Shepherd)

Wenn auf dem höchsten Fels ich steh',
In's tiefe Tal hernieder seh',
Und singe.

Fern aus dem tiefen dunkeln Tal
Schwingt sich empor der Widerhall
Der Klüfte.

Je weiter meine Stimme dringt,
Je heller sie mir wieder klingt
Von unten.

Mein Liebchen wohnt so weit von mir,
Drum sehn' ich mich so heiß nach ihr
Hinüber.

When, from the highest rock up here,
I look deep down into the valley,
And sing,

Far from the valley dark and deep
Echoes rush through, upward and back to me,
The chasm.

The farther that my voice resounds,
So much the brighter it echoes
From under.

My sweetheart dwells so far from me,
I long hotly to be with her
Over there.

Varnhagen – "Nächtlicher Schall" (Nightly Sound)

In tiefem Gram verzehr ich mich,
Mir ist die Freude hin,
Auf Erden mir die Hoffnung wich,
Ich hier so einsam bin.

So sehnend klang im Wald das Lied,
So sehnend klang es durch die Nacht,
Die Herzen es zum Himmel zieht
Mit wunderbarer Macht.

I am consumed in misery,
Happiness is far from me,
Hope has on earth eluded me,
I am so lonesome here.

So longingly did sound the song,
So longingly through wood and night,
Towards heaven it draws all hearts
With amazing strength.

Wilhelm Müller – "Liebesgedanken" (Love Thoughts)

Der Frühling will kommen,
Der Frühling, meine Freud',
Nun mach' ich mich fertig
Zum Wandern bereit.

The Springtime will come,
The Springtime, my happiness,
Now must I make ready
To wander forth.
