= Willem Kroesbergen =

Dutch harpsichord builder

Willem Kroesbergen (born 1943) is a Dutch harpsichord builder. His instruments have been used by soloists and ensembles, including Ton Koopman, Masaaki Suzuki and his Bach Collegium Japan and Reinhard Goebel's Musica Antiqua Köln. In 1991 he was awarded the Casper Hogenbijl Prize for his contribution to international early music. In 2007 he retired and moved to Cape Town in South Africa. After his retirement he did research on temperaments well known and in use during J.S. Bach's life.
