= Prayner Conservatory of Music and Dramatic Arts in Vienna =

Coordinates: 48°11′46″N 16°21′44″E

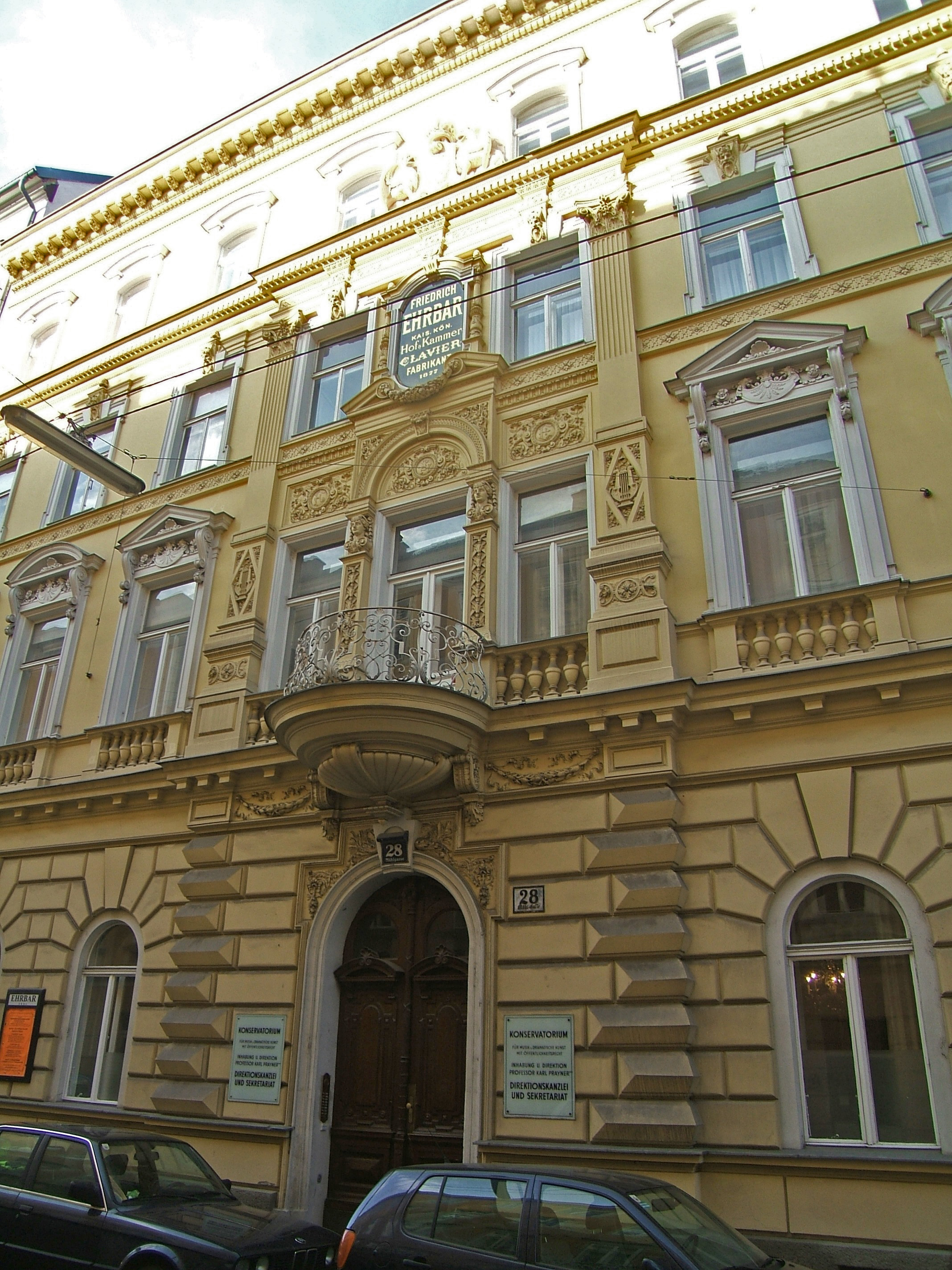
Vienna Prayner Conservatory for Music and Dramatic Arts

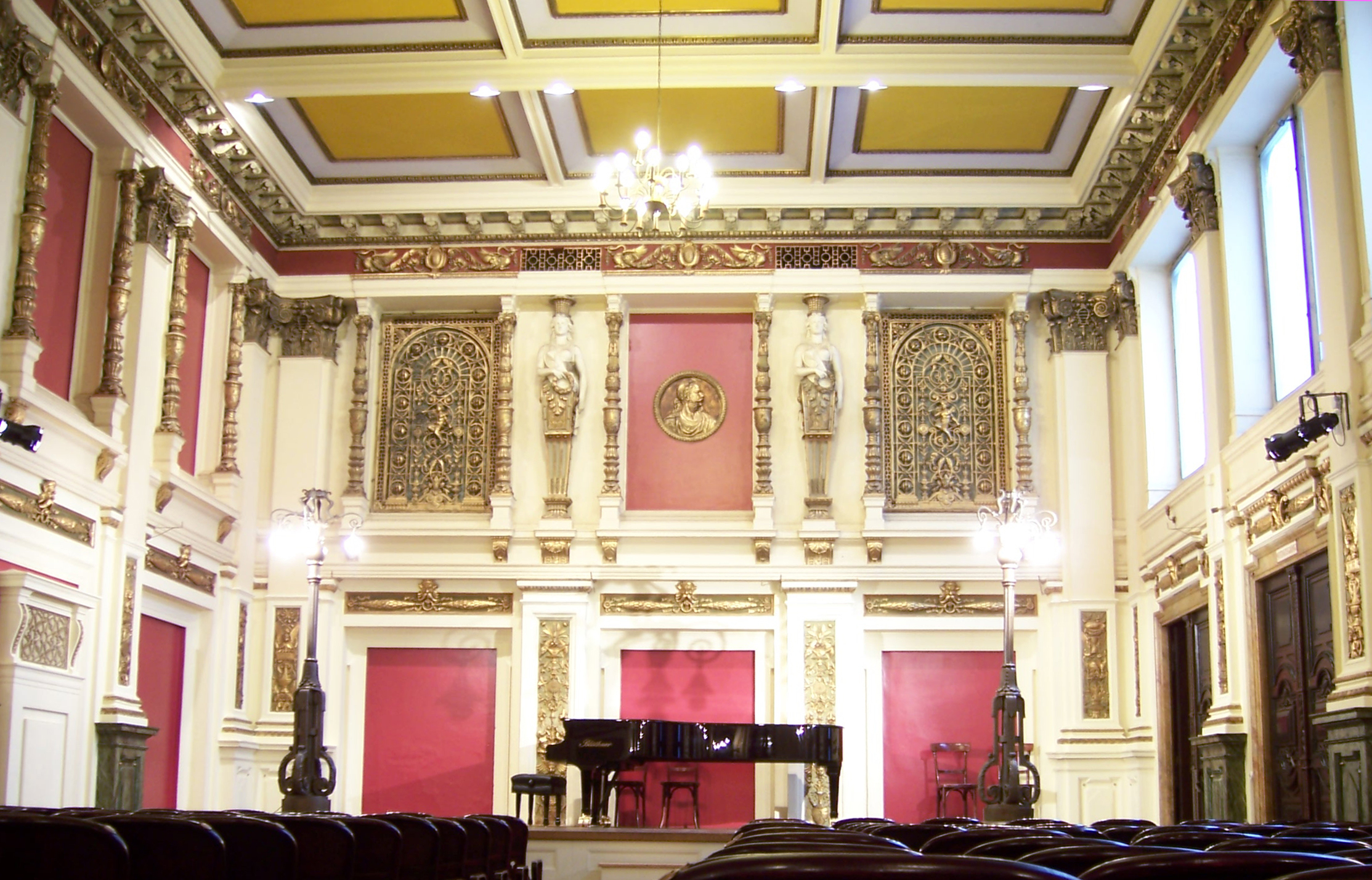
Ehrbar-Saal-Podium

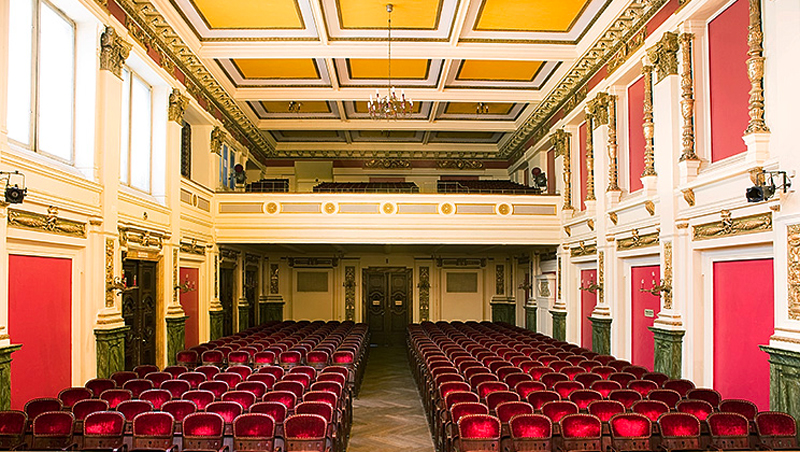
Ehrbar-Saal-Galerie

The Prayner Conservatory of Music and Dramatic Arts in Vienna licensed by the Austrian authorities founded in 1905, and has developed into one of the most well-known and historical conservatories in the city of Vienna.

This conservatory has been permanently closed since June 2020. The below is no longer valid.

Currently the conservatory offers undergraduate, graduate, and post-graduate degrees as well as offering adult education and pre-college education. Students of all levels can take voice or instrumental lessons, and have the opportunity to perform in the orchestra or choir. At the end of the study at Prayner Conservatory the students graduate an internationally recognized Austrian "Artistic Diploma" in the following by the Austrian authorities licensed fields of study: Piano, Singing, Violin, Violoncello, Viola, Double-Bass, Flute, Clarinet, Oboe, Bassoon, Trumped, Trombone, Horn, Tuba, Guitar, Harp, Accordion, Percussion Instruments as well as for Composition, Conducting, Accompanying classes, Chamber Music, Opera, and Orchestra Repertoire.

Conservatory's Center location includes two existing buildings on A-1040 Mühlgasse 28-30 and A-1060 Mariahilferstrasse 51 - with its historically significant facades and relatively sound structure.

The Prayner Conservatory has more than a hundred teachers including Maksimiljan Cencic, Galina Mauracher (Gal Rasché), Dr. Massimo Stefanizzi, Dr. Giorgi Latso, Mag. Josef Stolz, Valbona Naku, Filimon Ginalis, Barbara Górzyńska, Alexandra Karastoyanova-Hermentin, Karin Reda, Ulf-Dieter Soyka, Gerald Smrzek, Victoria Loukianetz and Franz Zettl.
