= Caroline Esterházy =

Hungarian countess and pianist (1811–1851)

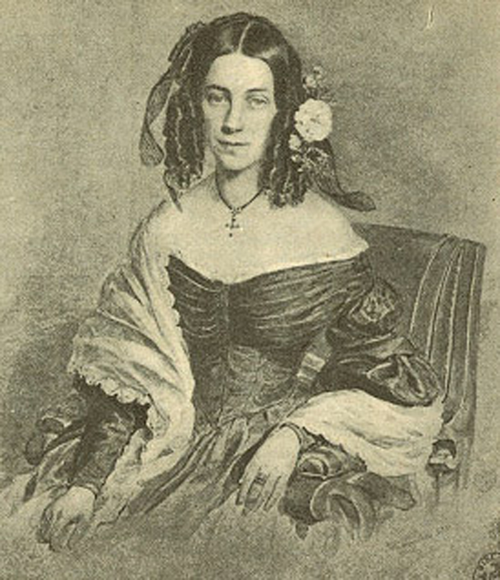
- Born: 2 September 1805; Penzing (Vienna), Austrian Empire
- Died: 14 March 1851 (aged 45); Pressburg, Kingdom of Hungary, Austrian Empire

Countess Caroline Esterházy de Galántha (Hungarian: galánthai grófnő Esterházy Karolina; 2 September 1805 – 14 March 1851) was a Hungarian noblewoman, and a friend and muse to composer Franz Schubert. A dedication of his Fantasia in F minor D 940 to her can be found in the posthumous first edition.

== Biography ==
The Countess was born in 1805, in Penzing (Vienna) to János Károly, Count Esterházy de Galántha and Countess Róza Festetics de Tolna. By birth she was a member of the wealthy and illustrious Esterházy family.

She received music lessons from Franz Schubert during the summers of 1818 and 1824 on her family estate at Zseliz (today Želiezovce). To judge from her collection of music scores and the markings in them, it appears she was an accomplished pianist. After the summer of 1824, she and Schubert remained friends until his death in 1828.

On 8 April 1844, she married Count Karl Folliott de Crenneville-Poutet, but the marriage broke down within a few months and the couple separated. She died in Pressburg, Kingdom of Hungary (present-day Bratislava in Slovakia), on 14 March 1851, from an intestinal disorder.

== Relationship with Schubert ==
The nature of Schubert's feelings for the countess has been the subject of much speculation.

Schubert's friends believed him to be in unrequited love with the young countess, and there are a number of references to this in their writings.

Eduard von Bauernfeld wrote of his friend:

He was, in fact, head over heels in love with one of his pupils, a young Countess Esterházy [...]. In addition to his lessons there, he also visited the Count's home, from time to time, under the aegis of his patron, the singer Vogl. [...] On such occasions Schubert was quite content to take a back seat, to remain quietly by the side of his adored pupil, and to thrust love's arrow ever deeper into his heart. [...] Countess Caroline may be looked upon as his visible, beneficent muse, as the Leonore of this musical Tasso.

According to Schönstein, "when [the countess] once jokingly teased Schubert that he had never dedicated a piece of his to her he responded: 'Why do that? Everything is dedicated to you anyway.'" A dedication of his Fantasia in F minor (D.940) to her can only be found in the posthumous first edition, not in Schubert's autograph.

== In popular culture ==
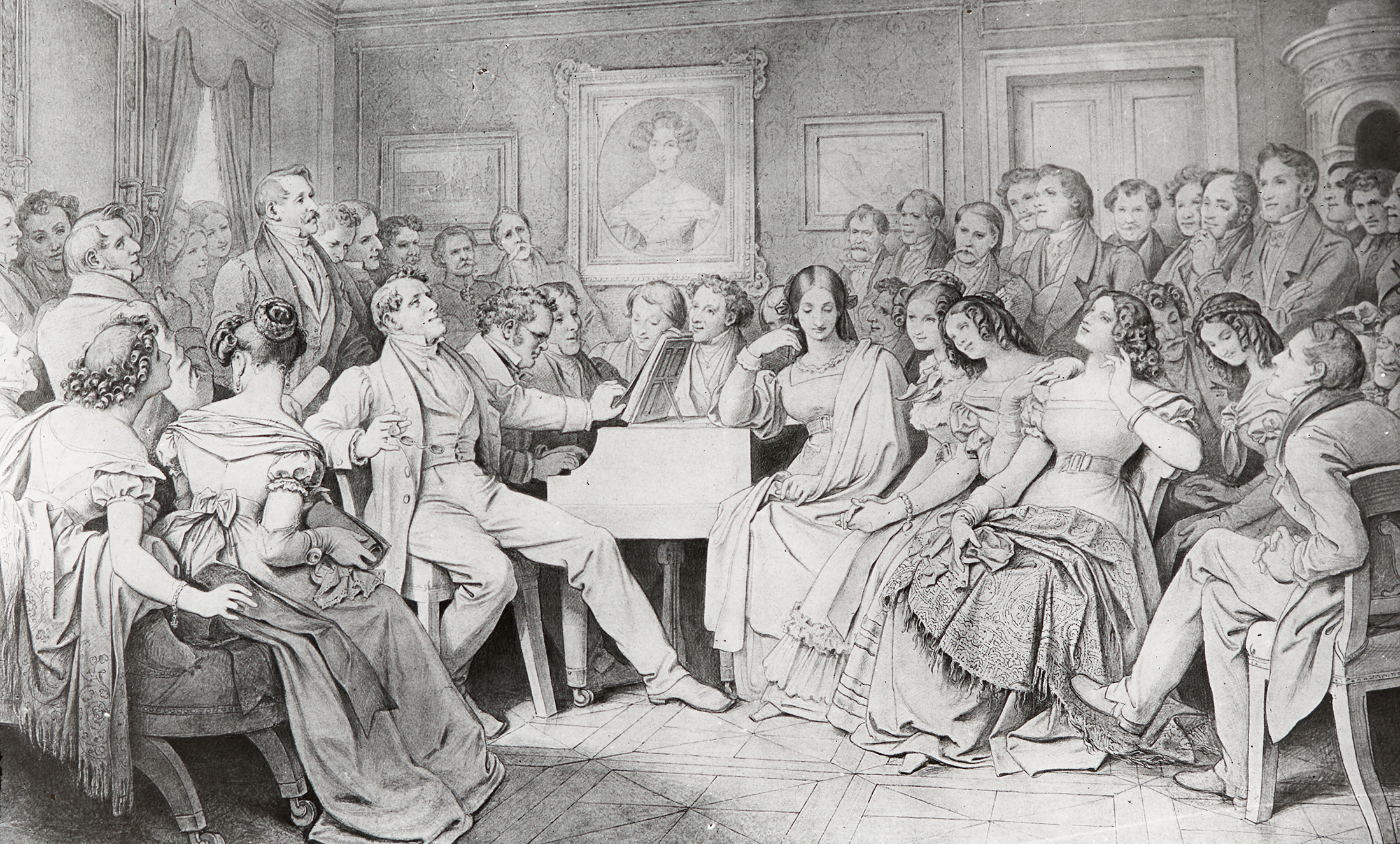
"Schubertiade at Josef von Spaun", by Moritz von Schwind. A portrait of Caroline Esterházy can be seen hanging over the piano.

Moritz von Schwind, in his drawing "Schubertiade at Josef von Spaun", shows a portrait of Caroline Esterházy hanging over the piano which Schubert is playing.

A number of films have fictionalized Esterházy’s relationship with Schubert, including Gently My Songs Entreat (1933), Unfinished Symphony (1934) and Symphony of Love (1954).

The countess is also a main character in the French novella Un été à quatre mains.
