= Robert Keller (music editor) =

German music editor (1828–1891)

Robert Keller (1828-1891) was a German music editor.

Keller was born on 6 January 1828 in Harpersdorf in Lower Silesia. He moved to Berlin where he became a musical editor for the music publishing company N. Simrock. Keller edited and arranged a substantial number of works by Johannes Brahms and Antonín Dvořák. He died in Berlin on 16 June 1891.
