= Piano four hands =

Duet using one piano

"Schindler's List" - Four Hand Arrangement by The Latsos
The Latsos Piano Duo (Giorgi Latso and Anna Latso) perform Schindler's List- four hand arrangement, Live recording from Great Music at St. James, California. (March 2nd, 2025)

Allegro of Diabelli's Variations Op. 149 No. 26

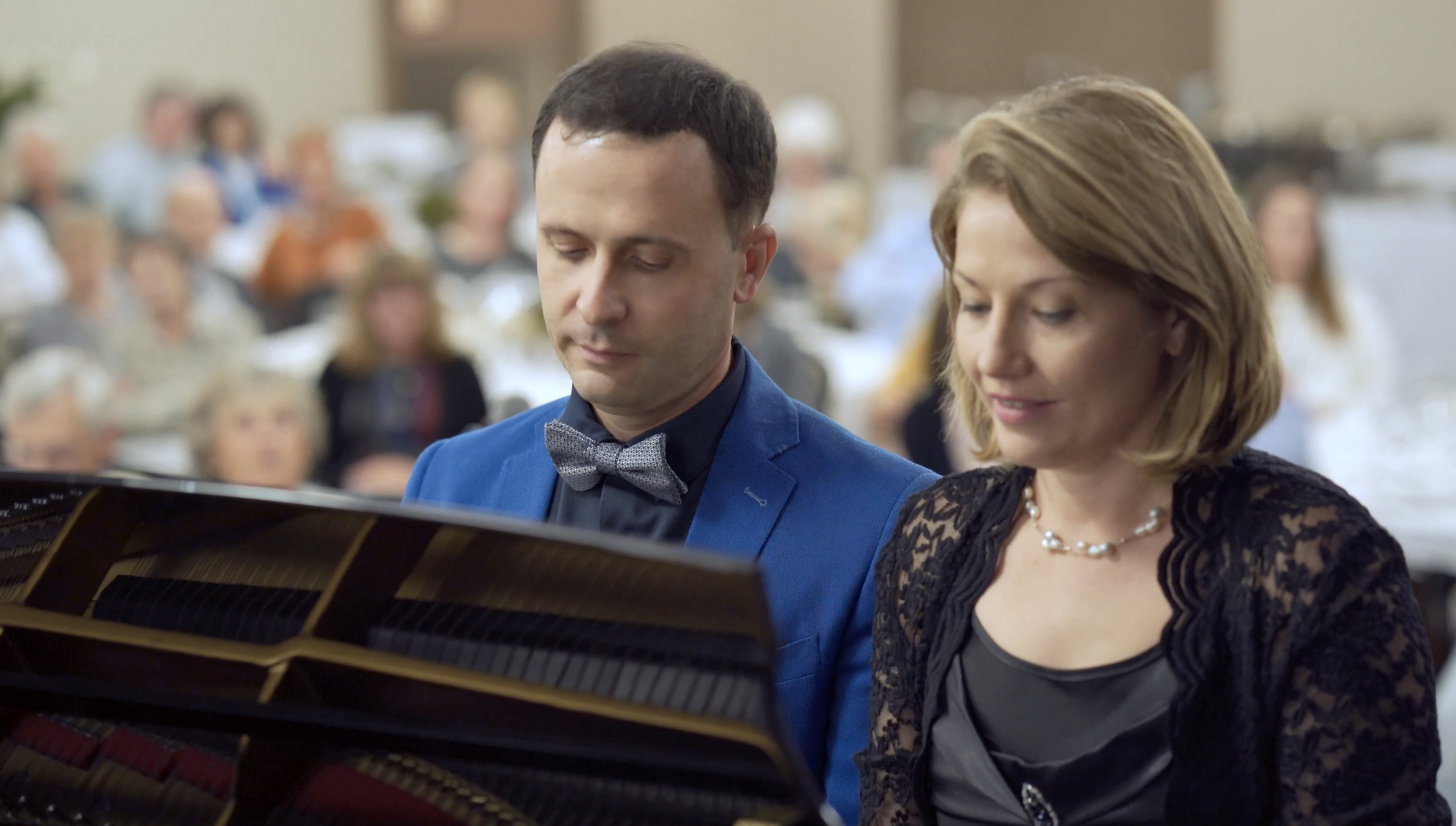
Classical piano duo The Latsos, performing for Utah National State Conference, 2021

Piano four hands (French: À quatre mains, German: Zu vier Händen, Vierhändig, Italian: a quattro mani) is a type of piano duet in which the two players play a piece arranged for four hands on the same piano simultaneously. A duet with the two players playing separate pianos is generally referred to simply as a piano duet or piano duo.

Music written for piano four hands is usually printed so that left-hand pages contain only the part for the pianist sitting on the left, while right-hand pages contain only the part for the pianist sitting on the right. The upper part (right) is called primo while the lower part (left) is called secondo.

== Repertoire ==
=== Arrangements ===
By far the greater proportion of music "à quatre mains" consists of arrangements of orchestral and vocal compositions and of quartets and other groups for stringed instruments. Indeed, scarcely any composition of importance for any combination of instruments exists which has not been arranged and published in this form, which on account of its comparative facility of performance is calculated to reproduce the characteristic effects of such works more readily and faithfully than arrangements for piano solo. Sometimes, organ works and works for piano two hands with advanced difficulty have also been arranged for piano four hands, in order to make them accessible to amateurs. Such arrangements were especially popular before the development of recording technology, as the vast majority of the time there would be no other way to hear many of the best-known works of music.

=== Original works ===
The increase in complexity, power, volume and variety obtainable where there are two performers, instead of one, offers a legitimate inducement to composers to write original music in this form. While such opportunity has by no means been neglected, it is one that has been—to date at least—taken up less than some might have expected (or hoped).

The earliest known printed works for pianoforte à quatre mains were published in London in January 1777, when Charles Burney printed four duets for four-hand piano, with a preface explaining this unusual practice. Another early exemplar was published in Dessau about 1782, under the title Drey Sonaten füre Clavier als Doppelstücke fur zwey Personen mit vier Handen von C. H. Müller. However, before this, Ernst Wilhelm Wolf, the musical director at Weimar in 1761, had written one or more sonatas for two performers, which were published after his death. The young Mozart, too, wrote four-hand pieces for himself and his sister to play: K.381 in D Major dates from 1772. So far as is known these were the first compositions of their kind, although the idea of the employment of two performers (but not on one instrument) may have originated with Johann Sebastian Bach, who wrote three concertos for two harpsichords, three for three, and one for four, all with stringed instruments accompaniment. But the short compass of the keyboard, which in Bach's time and indeed until about 1770 never exceeded five octaves, was ill-adapted to the association of two performers on the same instrument, and it is perhaps on this account that early composers left so little music for four hands.

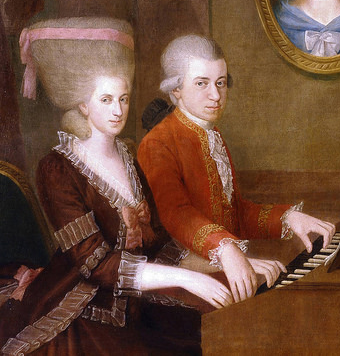
Wolfgang Amadeus and Maria Anna Mozart in 1780

Haydn and Beethoven also appear to have had little inclination to compose this type of work. According to Fétis, Haydn wrote but one piece à quatre mains: a divertissement, which was never published (two other sonatas published under his name, op. 81 and 86, are spurious). Beethoven left one sonata (op. 6), three marches (op. 45), and two sets of variations, though none of these are considered to be of great importance. The work of Mozart in this field is more significant: he wrote nine pianoforte duets, two of which (the Adagio and Allegro in F minor, and the Fantasia in F minor) were originally written for a mechanical organ or musical clock in a Vienna exhibition and were afterwards arranged for piano by an unknown person. Among his other duets, piano sonatas KV 497 and KV 521, both from his Vienna years, stand out.

Among the best-known composers, Schubert made the fullest use of the original effects possible with musicians playing à quatre mains. His compositions include the Sonata in C major for piano four-hands, D 812, the Divertissement à la hongroise, D 818, and Fantasia in F minor for piano four-hands, D 940. In addition to these, he also wrote fourteen marches, six polonaises, four sets of variations, three rondos, one sonata, one set of dances, and four separate pieces.

Among the German Romantic composers, the four-hand works of Schumann and Brahms are the most interesting. Mendelssohn wrote only one original work of the kind, although he himself arranged some of his orchestral works and also his Octet, and the Variations in B-flat major for piano, op. 83, in this form. Besides writing a number of small pieces for two performers, Schumann made a very novel and successful experiment in his Spanische Liebeslieder (op. 138), which consists of ten pieces for four voices (being songs, duets, and a quartet), with piano four-hand accompaniment. An analogous idea was later carried out by Brahms, who wrote two sets of waltzes for four hands and four voices (Liebeslieder Walzer, Op. 52, and Neue Liebeslieder, Op 65). Among Brahms' instrumental four-hands pieces, the best-known is 16 Waltzes, Op 39. A well-known piece by a French Romantic composer is the Dolly Suite by Fauré.

== Organ four hands ==
Organ music for four hands is very rare, although the experiment has been made by Adolf Friedrich Hesse, Christian Gottlob Höpner, and Gustav Merkel; but no increased effect appears to be obtainable from such an arrangement which can at all compensate for its practical inconvenience.

== See also ==
- Category:Compositions for piano four-hands
- Piano six hands
- Piano reduction
