= The Latsos Piano Duo =

American piano duo

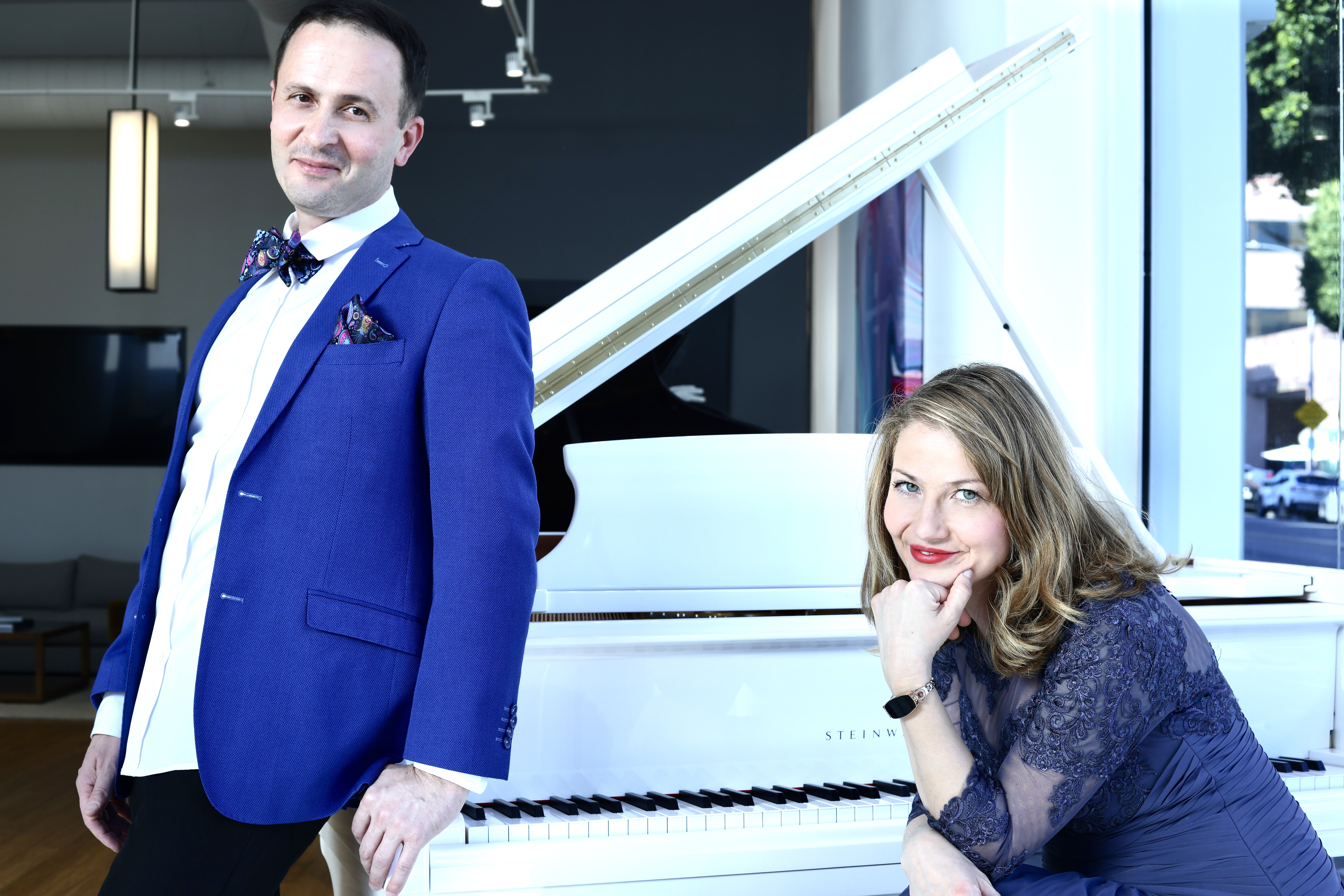
The Latsos at Steinway & Sons in Beverly Hills, California 2023

The Latsos is an American classical piano duo formed by the husband-wife team of Giorgi Latso and Anna Latso. Although they initially pursued solo careers, they teamed up as duo-pianists in 2013 and conducted annual international tours, four-hands piano recitals and concertos for two pianos and orchestra in Europe, Americas and Asia. Duo formed in the city of Vienna in 2013 is best known for their interpretations of Franz Schubert piano pieces for Four-hands, and also known for their light arrangements of familiar classical pieces, movie soundtracks, and show tunes according to a press release from The Guardian, British daily newspaper.

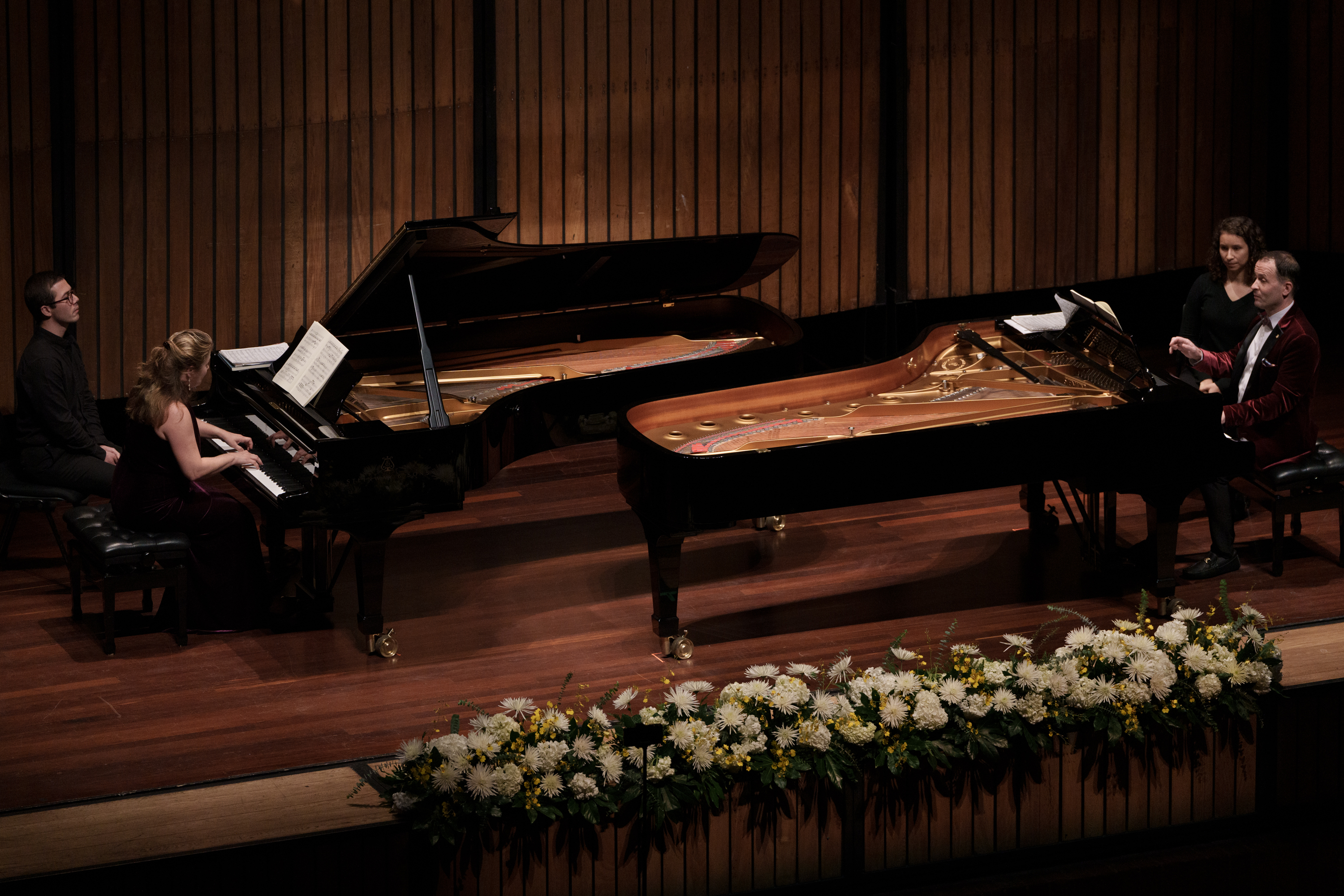
The Latsos performing in the Medellín Metropolitan Theatre, 2024

The Latsos Duo has resided in Austria, from 2013-2019, where Giorgi had joined the piano faculty of the Vienna Prayner Conservatory of Music and Dramatic Arts as professor of piano and at the same time he was a guest professor at the Liceu Conservatory in Barcelona. Subsequently, since 2020 they have made their homes in Los Angeles.

== Repertoire ==
The Latsos's repertoire ranges from Bach to 21st-century classical music, including all major works for piano four hands and orchestral transcriptions, with a focus on French, Russian and German composers. The duo performs at concert halls across Europe, America and Asia including Music Center Los Angeles, Los Angeles County Museum of Art,, Plaza Theater Palm Springs Beverly Hills Greystone, Torrance Performing Arts Center, San Diego Neil Morgan Auditorium, Yamaha Center in Bangkok, Steinway Thailand, Steinway Malaysia, Lee Foundation Concert Hall Singapore, Shanghai Music Center, Imperial Marmorsaal Concert Hall Vienna, Metropolitan Philharmonic Hall Medellín, Colombia Permaisuri Zarith Sofiah Opera House in Johor Bahru, Ehrbarsaal in Vienna, Linzer Stadthalle, Belgais Center for Arts in Portugal, Music Center in Moscow, etc.

The Latsos have rediscovered, performed and recorded a number of unusual and forgotten works from the duo-piano repertoire, including all the Schubert duets and duos. The pianists have developed a close relationship with composer Joe Giarrusso, who created and dedicated some four-hand pieces especially for them. Since 2013 they have been performing worldwide as piano duo and have appeared at musical centers and festivals, including Chopin Music Festival, Aspen Music Festival, Steinway Festival, Yamaha Festival, Schubertiade Music Festival, the Osterfestival Tirol and the Ruhr Piano Festival, Asia Pacific International Arts Festival, China-Beijing International Awards Ceremony

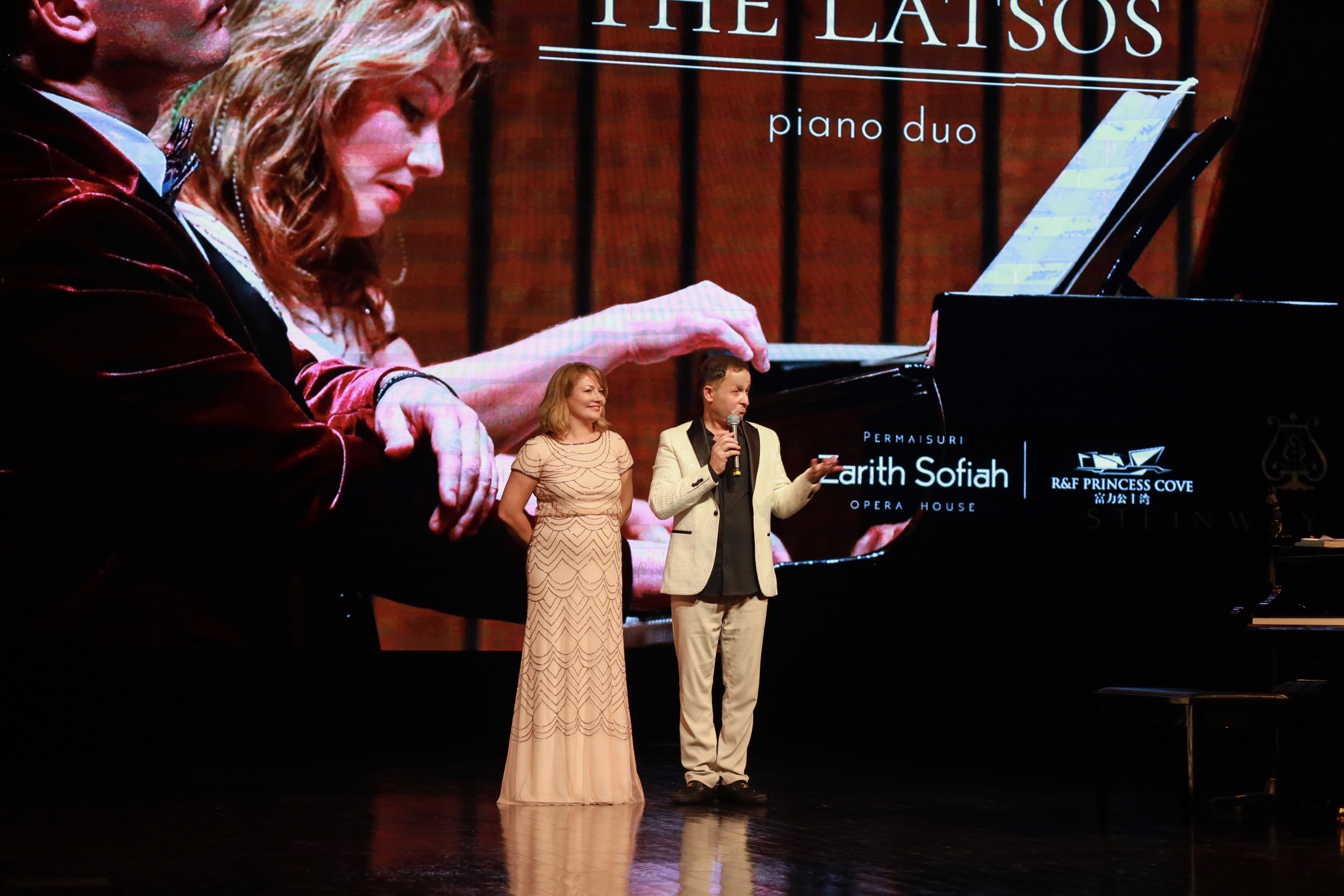
The Latsos performing in 2026 at The Princess Opera House in Johor Bahru, Malaysia

Through commissioning numerous compositions and collaboration with other artistic genres, Latsos has expanded the boundaries of piano-duo presentation. They have also arranged for 2 pianos and four-hands transcriptions from a selected american movie scores by the celebrated composers such as John Williams, Erich Wolfgang Korngold, John Sousa, etc. and has been hailed "one of the finest transcribers of our time" in the european press.

The Latsos have performed and recorded a number pieces from the duo-piano repertoire, including all the Schubert duets and duos. The Latsos are often guests on radios such as KUSC Radio, Classic FM, Sunday Live, NDR Kultur, Classical Sundays and many more. They have released three albums of piano music.

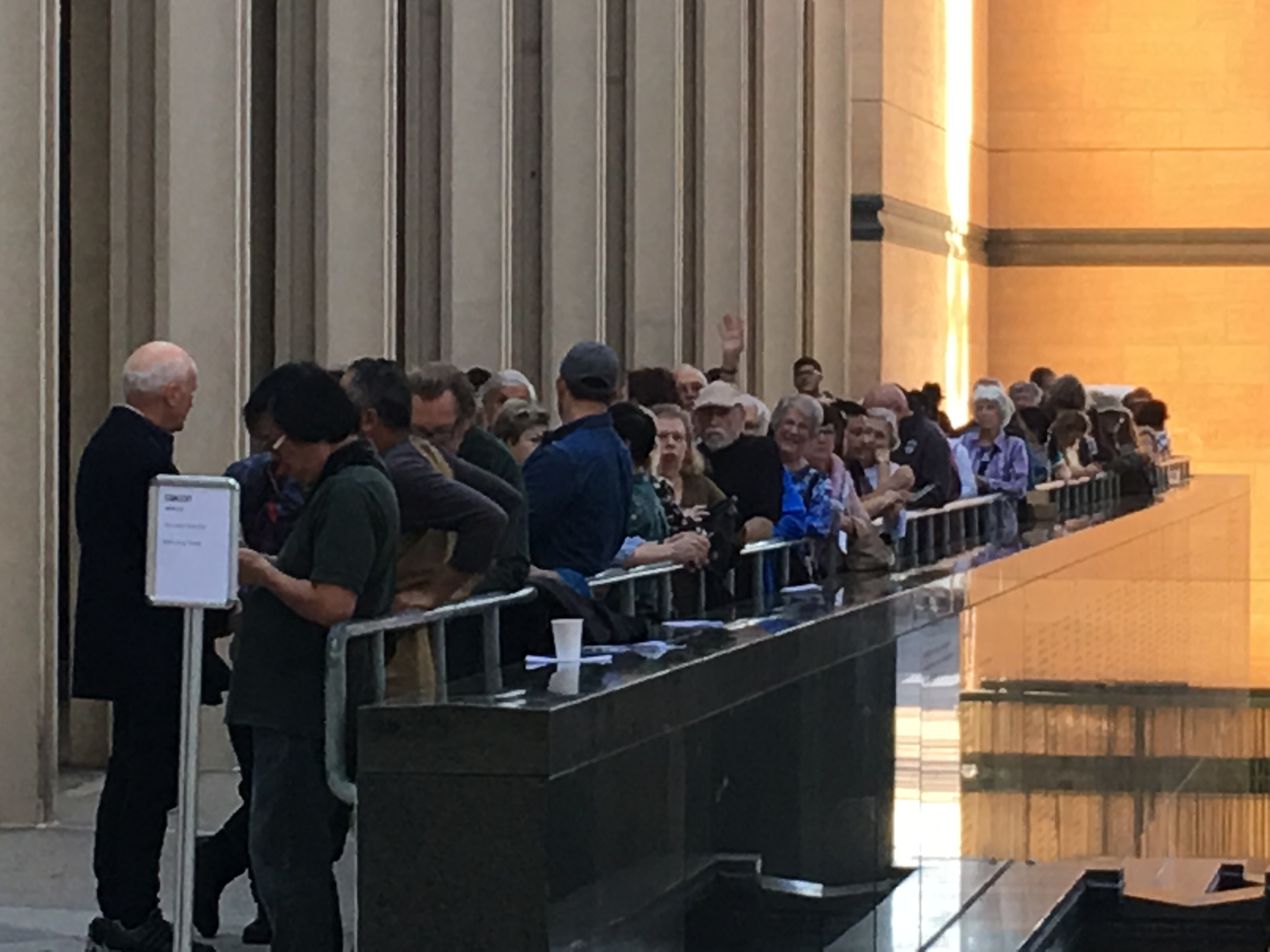
The Latsos’s fans are seen waiting in ticket line at Los Angeles County Museum of Art venue, 2019

"...The Latsos' execution of these transitions [in Schubert's Fantasia] was exemplary, so that their performance gained strength and impetus as it proceeded, culminating in a powerful account of maybe the darkest final cadence Schubert ever wrote, a procession of grinding minor chords that descend like a glacier sliding into a freezing ocean." LA Opus wrote.

One of their recent concert presentation held at the historic Doheny Estate & Gardens as part of the Music in the Mansion Series was filmed by Beverly Hills Warner Cable Television and live-streamed on BHTV10 Channel.

The duo also supports the mission of charities by organizing and performing benefit concerts each year. They often offer concerts performances for non-profit organizations and institutions that serve underprivileged communities, children with special needs, hospital patients, and the elderly. In May 2019 in collaboration with National Solidarity Fund and The Embassy of Georgia to the Republic of Austria, The Latsos Duo performed gala charity concert in support of children and young people under the age of 22 suffering from oncological disease in Georgia.

Extensive CD recording makes up an important part of their career: the Duo has released recordings of four-hand piano music not only with central works of the repertoire but also introducing less familiar names to a wide public. Their recordings have been praised for their programmatic ingenuity as well as their pianistic transparency and the brightness of the duo's interpretations.

The Latso's 4 hand arrangement "The Stars and Stripes Forever" has been published in 2023 and is protected by the National Library of Congress Copyright Office in Washington D.C.

Since August 2023 they have been officially designated and conferred as Steinway Ensemble Artist by Steinway & Sons, New York City.

In 2024 they created Amadeus International Foundation, a nonprofit organization with the mission to recognize and nurture young and talented pianists. The pair have been serving as Interim Artistic Directors since founding the organization.

== Master classes and lectures ==
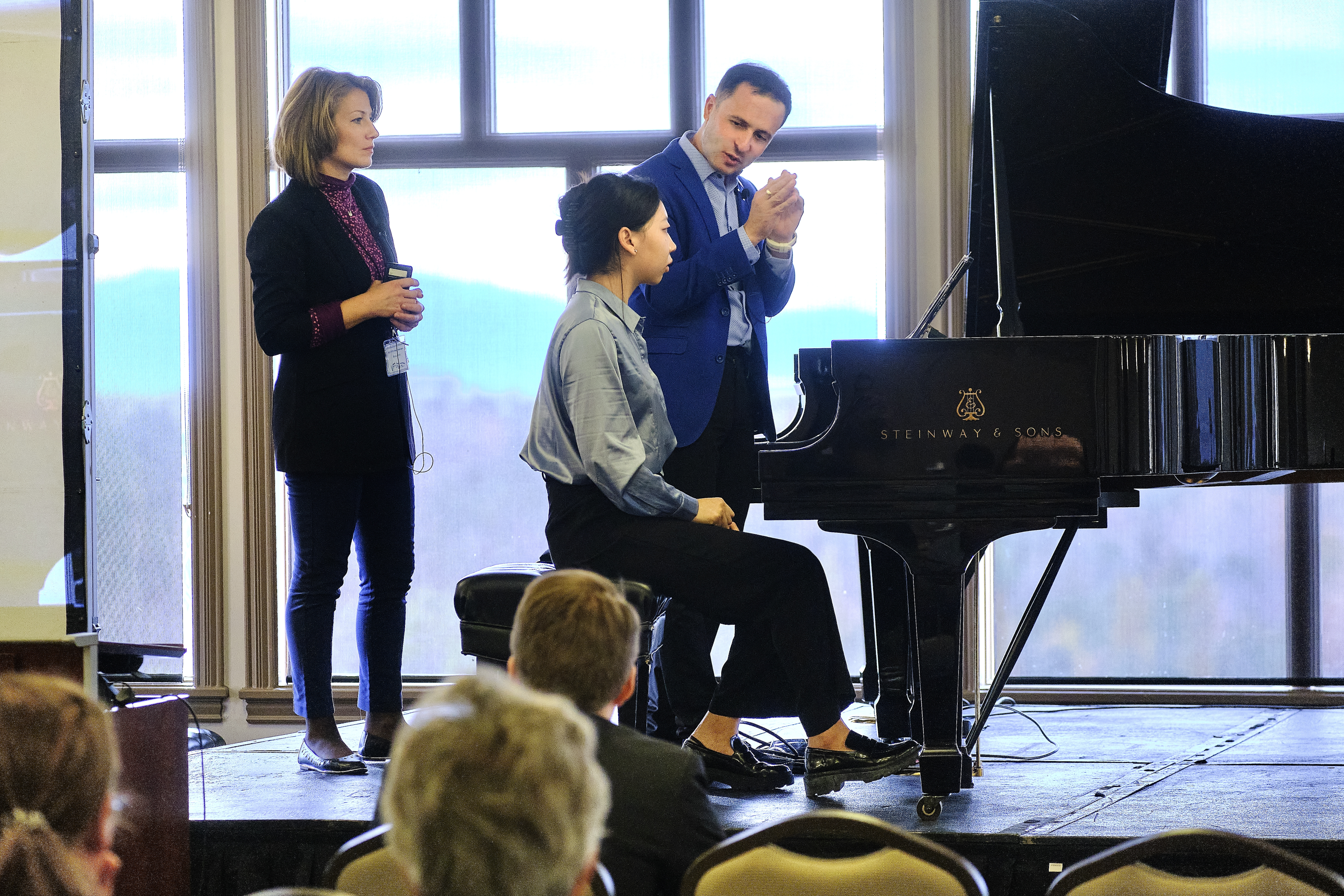
Utah Music Teachers Association Conference; Giorgi Latso & Anna Latso during the collegiate masterclasses

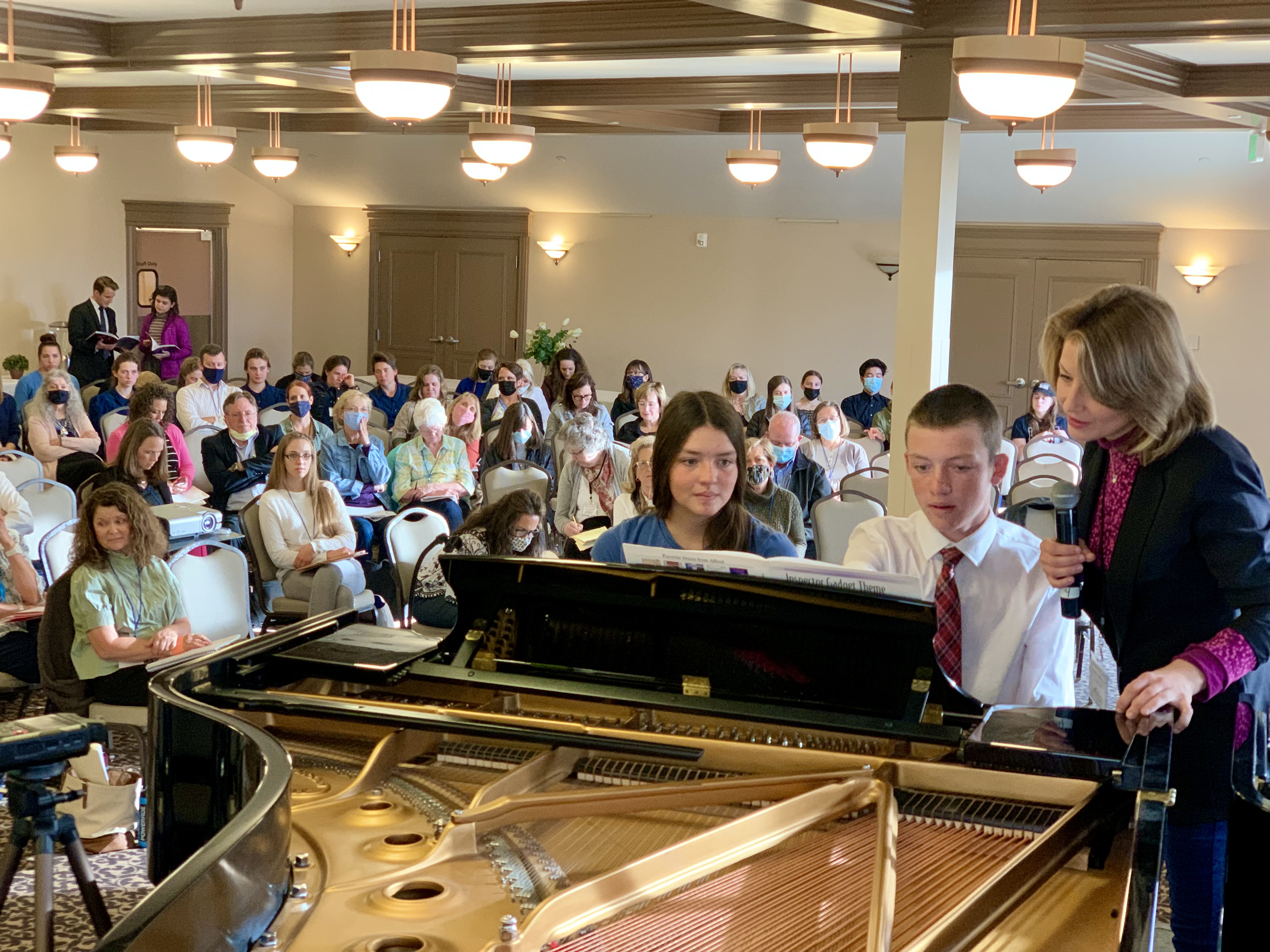
Anna Latso giving a Masterclasses at the 2021 Utah Music Teachers Association Conference MTNA

Giorgi and Anna Latso combine performance and teaching. As music educators, they have presented master classes and lectures at a number of universities in Europe, Russia, Asia, as well as across the United States and regularly invited to perform at prestigious music halls and scholarly conferences worldwide as well as served as judges at various international, national and regional piano competitions. They are frequent presenters at national, state and local conferences, universities, and local music teaching groups. Latsos have given various presentations and masterclasses, including national music conferences (MTNA).

The Latsos have been presenting collegiate masterclasses and workshops for regional and international conferences of the College Music Society, Music Teachers National Association Collegiate Chapters Symposiums, 2021 UMTA State Conference held in-person at Thanksgiving Point in Utah, 2023 Oregon Music Teachers Association State Conference at the Southern Oregon University, 2026 State Convention at Music Teachers’Association of California (MTAC) at the Hilton Los Angeles and many more.

== Awards and distinctions ==
- 2017 & 2022 - Winners of Beverly Hills National (USA) Auditions
- 2022 - Adjudicator Award, Asia Pacific International - Book of Records, Malaysia
- 2023 - Commendation for Music in the Mansion Festival, B.H. City Council, Los Angeles
- 2023 - 'Steinway Ensemble Artist' designation conferred by Steinway & Sons, New York City

== Reviews ==
"Thrilling and flamboyant, tender and passionate, vibrant and dynamic”. Internationale Chopin-Gesellschaft Vienna, Austria. Oberösterreichische Nachrichten hailed them for being “as expressive as they are technically perfect”. The Latsos are often Oberösterreichische Nachrichten praised for their unity of thought and execution, a music critic of their 2019 recital in Vienna wrote: "...while hearing them one thinks, not of two pianist at two pianos, but of twenty fingers at a double keyboard controlled by a single mind". Praised by the Los Angeles Times as “impeccable by any standard, highlighted with exquisite trills, drizzling runs and precise Mozartean dynamics”.
