= Giorgi Latso =

Georgian classical pianist

- გიორგი ლაცაბიძე
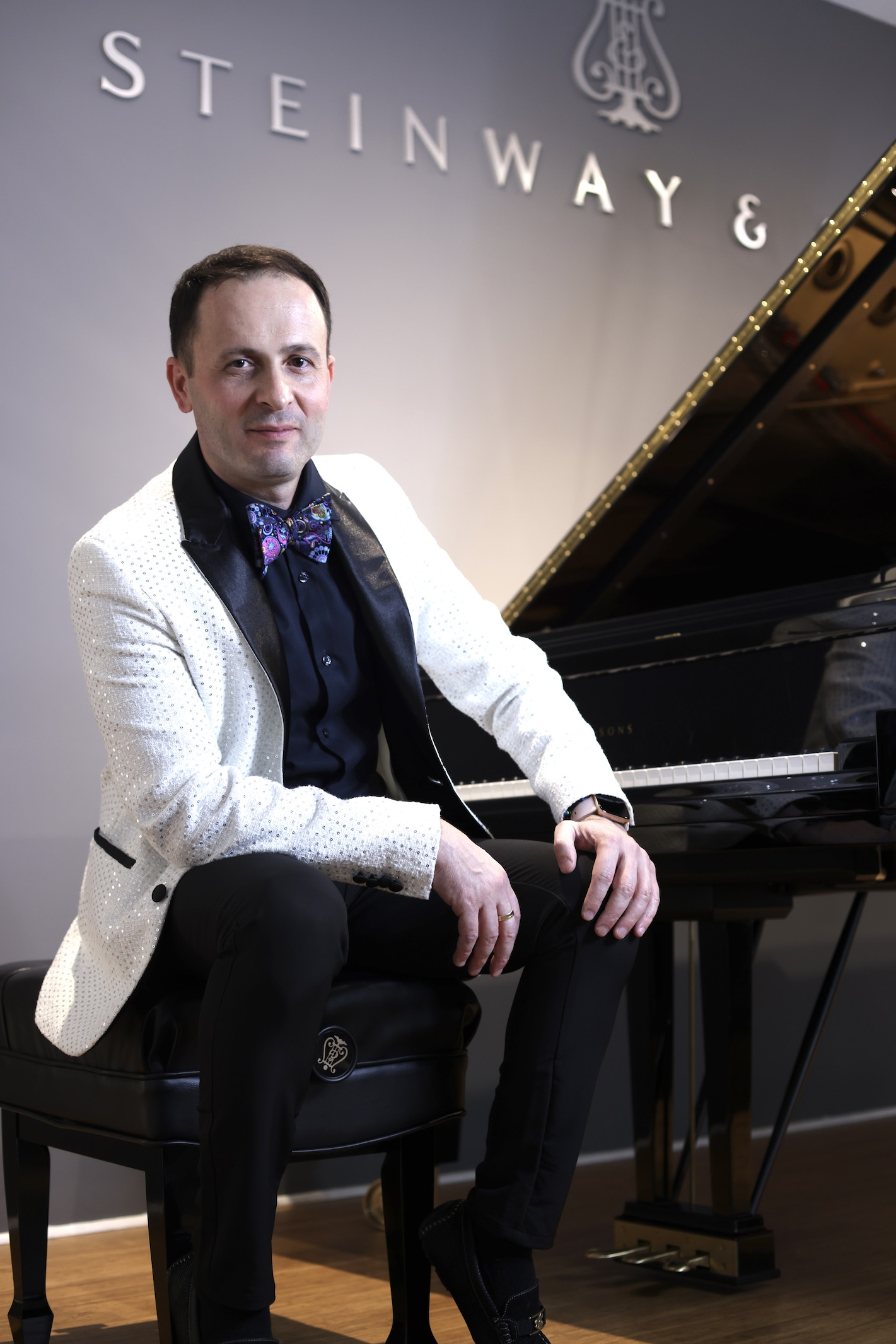
- Latso in 2023
- Born: Giorgi Latsabidze; 15 April 1978 (age 48); Tbilisi, Georgian SSR, Soviet Union
- Education: University of Southern California; Mozarteum University Salzburg; Hochschule für Musik, Theater und Medien Hannover; Tbilisi State Conservatoire
- Occupations: Musician; pianist; composer
- Years active: 1999–present
- Spouse: Anna Fedorova (m. 2013)
- Children: 3
- Parent(s): Irakli Latsabidze; Medea Latsabidze
- Musical career
- Genre: Classical
- Instrument: Piano
- Labels: Naxos; Steinway & Sons; Onward Entertainment
- Website: www.giorgilatso.com www.thelatsos.com

Giorgi Latso (born Giorgi Latsabidze, Georgian: გიორგი ლაცაბიძე, IPA: [ɡioɾɡi latsabidze]; 15 April 1978) is a Georgian-American concert pianist, film composer, arranger, adjudicator, improviser and Doctor of Musical Arts. Latso has won several international piano competitions and awards. He is best known for his interpretations of Chopin and Debussy. He is a founder & CEO of Amadeus International Foundation. His concerts have been broadcast on radio and television in Europe, Asia, and the Americas.

== Early life and studies ==
Latso was born on 15 April 1978 in Tbilisi, capital of the then Georgian Soviet Socialist Republic, where he started studying the piano at the age of six. He made his public debut at age eight. He was admitted at the Tbilisi State Conservatoire, where he eventually became a pupil of Rusudan Chojava. In 2004, he obtained a master's degree at the Hochschule für Musik, Theater und Medien Hannover in Hanover, Germany, and the Mozarteum University Salzburg in Salzburg, Austria. Latso pursued doctoral studies at the University of Southern California in Los Angeles under the mentoring of Stewart L. Gordon who studied with prominent pedagogues and concert artists including Olga Samaroff, Walter Gieseking, Cécile Staub Genhart, and Adele Marcus.

== Career ==
He has appeared at major festival venues in Salzburg, Vienna, Berlin, Mannheim, Florence, Lisbon, Beijing, Honolulu, Arturo Benedetti Michelangeli International Piano Festival and Monte-Carlo Piano Masters, among others, and has performed as a recitalist throughout the world. His concerts often feature his own compositions and virtuoso transcriptions.

After his performance of Beethoven's Emperor Concerto at WUK Kulturhaus, he was described in the Austrian press as "...a technically brilliant pianist imbued with a poignant lyricism and genuine profundity". Classical Music magazine said his recording of Debussy's Préludes showed "...extraordinary imagination and a musical tone rarely heard".

Latso composed the score for the film Waltz-Fantasy for which he won an award at the Bologna Film Festival in Italy in 2000. His compositions also include Variations on a Theme of J. S. Bach and Cyber Moment for violin and piano, which was commissioned and world premiered by the composer in Wigmore Hall, London, in 2010.

Among Latso's recordings are Chopin's 24 Études, 24 Preludes and four Scherzos; J. S. Bach's Goldberg Variations; Liszt's 12 Transcendental Études; and Debussy's Préludes, Book 2.

He has worked with musicians including Ernest Fleischmann, Christian Altenburger, Gianluigi Gelmetti, Jansug Kakhidze, David L. Wen, Irmina Trynkos, Friedrich Kleinhapl, Ivo Pogorelić, Yundi Li, Freddy Kempf and Joaquín Soriano.

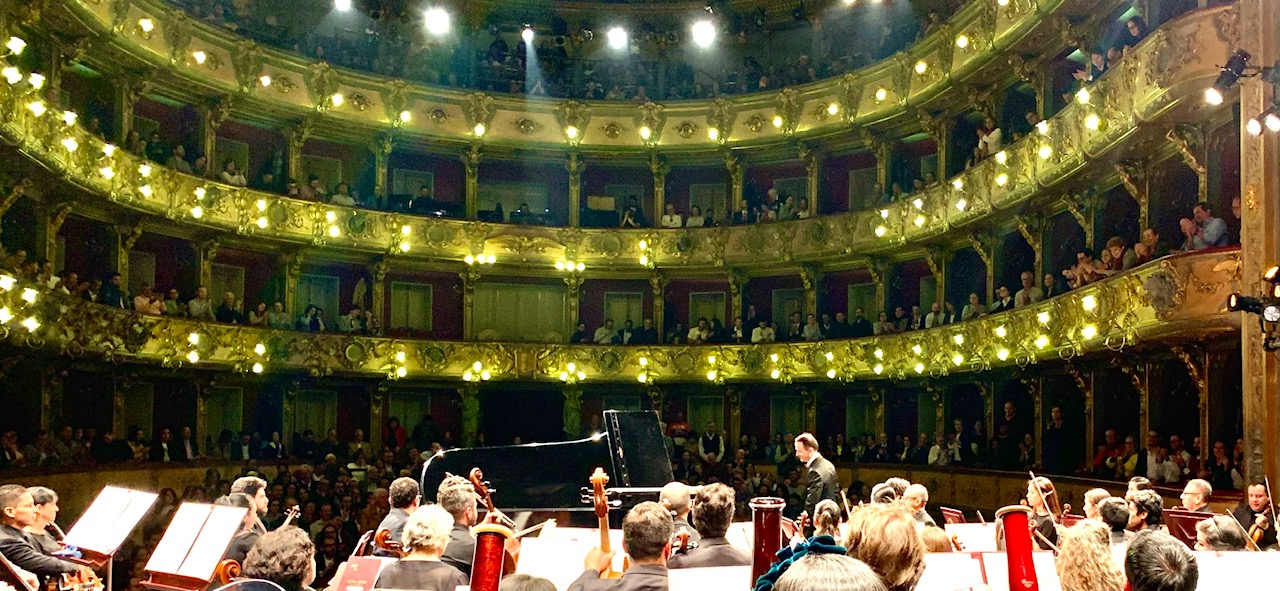
Giorgi Latso Performing with a National Symphony Orchestra of Colombia in Teatro Colón, Bogotá, in 2020

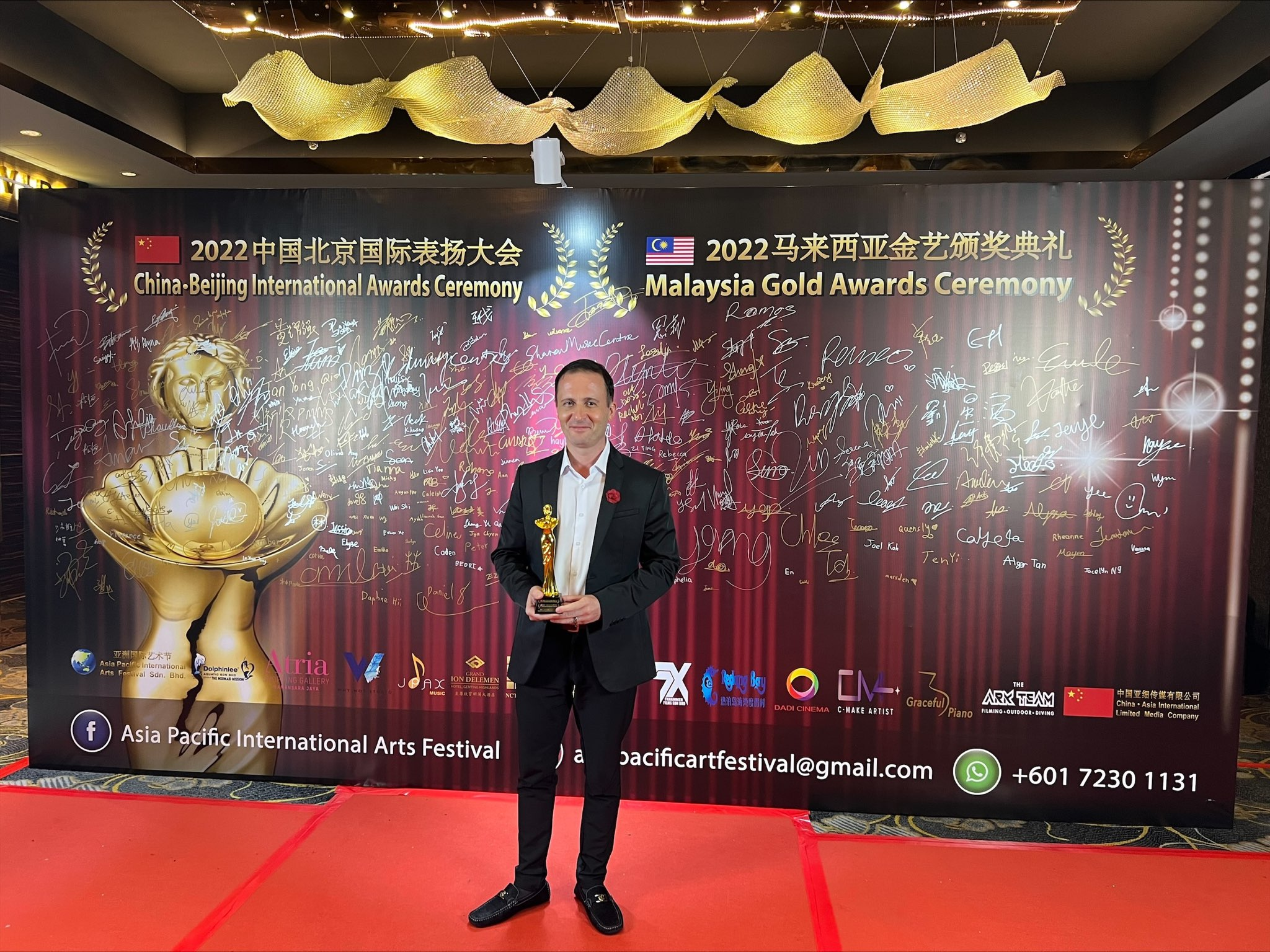
Latso receiving a prize on Malaysia Gold Award Ceremony 2022 in Kuala Lumpur, Malaysia

Latso gave several benefit concerts, including concerts held in the National Theater & Concert Hall, Taipei City, Vienna Ehrbar Concert Hall, Teatro Colón in Bogotá, Guido-Feger Concert Hall under the patronage of Princess Marie Aglaë of Liechtenstein. Volksblatt wrote: "Within the romantic repertoire you can with full justification call him a magnificent pianist and a magician of impeccable technique".

Latso has recorded a CD of the complete works for piano and violin by composer Ignatz Waghalter for Naxos Records, with the London Royal Philharmonic Orchestra, Irmina Trynkos and Alexander Walker.

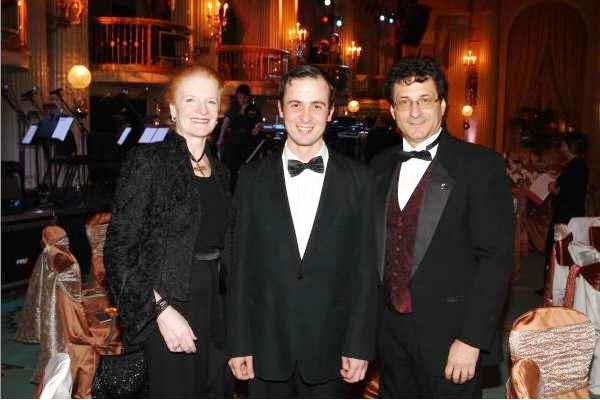
Giorgi Latso receives American philanthropist Carol Colburn Grigor award at the Charles Dickens Dinner held at the historic Millennium Biltmore Hotel in downtown Los Angeles, 2006

He has given broadcast performances on both radio and television in the United States, Europe, Asia and elsewhere. Latso was listed in the 65th edition of Who's Who in America, and Who's Who in American Art 2011. Since 2011 he has been a member of Pi Kappa Lambda.

In 2012, he was invited by Pope Benedict XVI to his residence in Vatican City to perform the Mozart Piano Concerto No. 21 with the Vienna Philharmonic at the Basilica di Santa Maria Maggiore in Rome. Latso made his debut at the Berliner Philharmonie concert hall in Berlin in 2012, and debut at the Slovak Philharmonic concert hall in Bratislava in 2014.

In 2013, he was invited by Marie, Princess of Liechtenstein, to move to Vienna, where he resided until 2019. He gave masterclasses and lectures at universities nationwide. Latso regularly serves on competition jury panels and has been a conference artist for several music teachers associations. From 2015 to 2018 he was a guest professor at the Conservatori Superior de Música del Liceu in Barcelona, Spain. Latso has been giving masterclasses for years at some of the world’s most prestigious music schools including the Tchaikovsky Moscow Conservatory, Hong Kong Academy for the Performing Arts, the Shanghai Conservatory of Music, National University of Colombia Mozarteum University of Salzburg, Vienna Conservatory of Music, Conservatori Superior de Música del Liceu, University of Southern California, San Francisco Conservatory of Music, Oberlin Conservatory of Music, the Tokyo University of the Arts, etc.

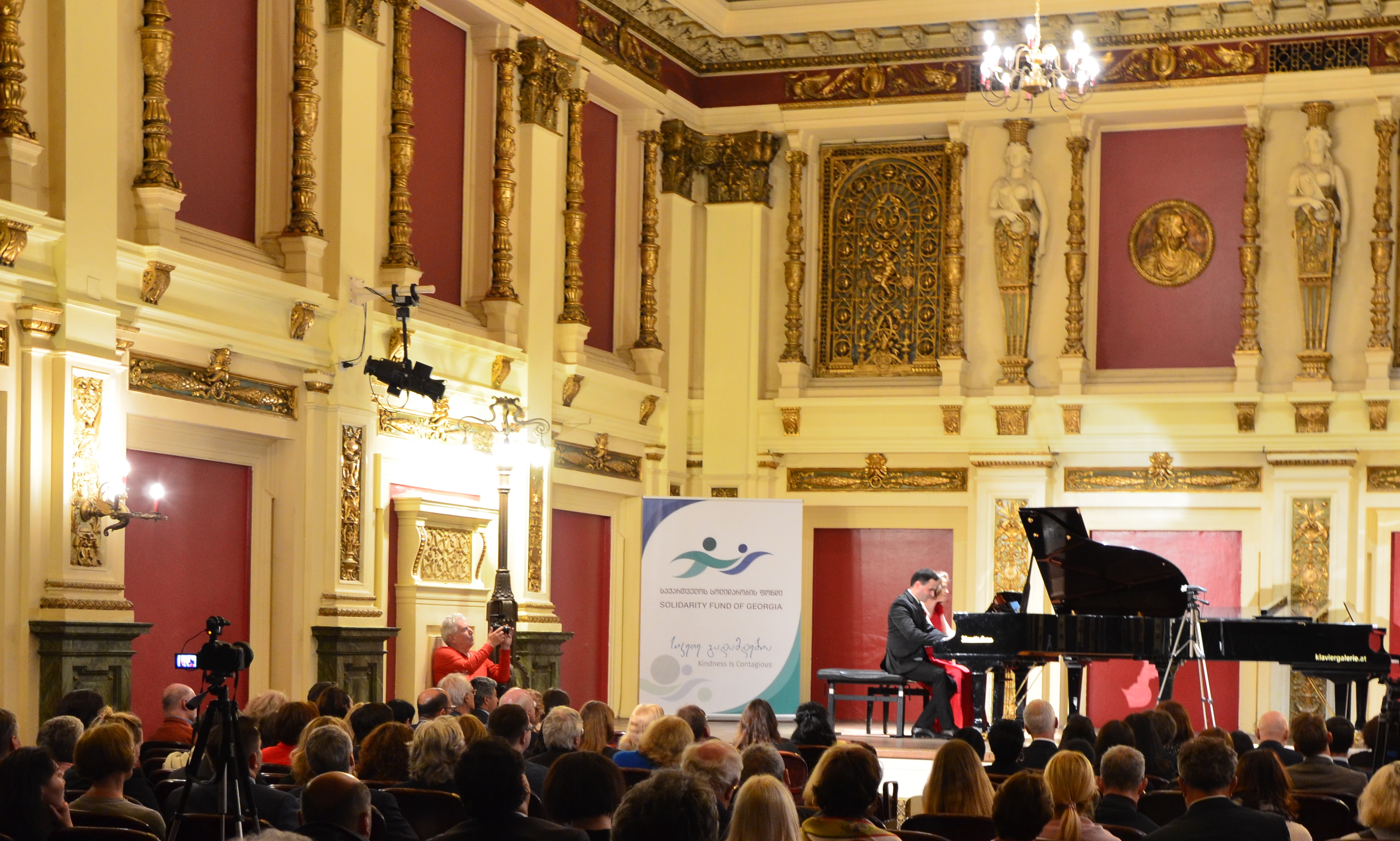
The Latsos giving a charity concert supporting children with the oncological disease, Ehrbar Concert Hall, Vienna, 2019

In 2013, Latso formed the Latsos Piano Duo with his wife Anna Fedorova-Latso. Since then, they have been performing four-hands piano recitals and concertos for two pianos worldwide as a piano duo and have appeared at musical centres and festivals as well as in scholarly conferences in Europe, Russia, America, and Asia. One of their concert presentation, held at the historic Doheny Estate & Gardens Beverly Hills as part of the Music in the Mansion Series, was filmed by Beverly Hills Warner Cable Television and live-streamed on BHTV10 Channel. The duo supports the mission of charities by organizing and performing benefit concerts. They offer concert performances for non-profit organizations and institutions that serve underprivileged communities, children with special needs, hospital patients, and the elderly. In May 2019 with National Solidarity Fund and The Embassy of Georgia to the Republic of Austria, they performed gala charity concert supporting children and young people suffering from oncological disease in Georgia.

His 2020 performance with National Symphony Orchestra of Colombia in Teatro Colón was reviewed in the Diario gratuito ADN Colombia as: "...his piano playing that combines technical wizardry with poetic lyricism sometimes sounds as mighty as the 100 member orchestra. Latsos' clarity of articulation, his warm, soft-grained tone, and his virtuosity was so formidable as to be unnoticeable."

In April 2021 Latso was named an honorary Ambassador of the Los Angeles Philharmonic International Committee. In 2022 he received International Adjudicator Award 2022 at the Asia Pacific International Arts Festival, Book of Records, in Kuala Lumpur, Malaysia.

Latso's four-hand arrangement of "The Stars and Stripes Forever" was published in 2023 and is protected by the United States Copyright Office in Washington D.C.

In 2024 Latso created the Amadeus International Foundation, a nonprofit charitable entity offering an intensive program of master classes, public concerts and audience forums, with the mission to recognize and nurture young and talented pianists. He has served as CEO and interim artistic director since founding the organization.

== Influences ==
Latso has mentioned the following pianists as having inspired him: "Of those whom I heard on the stage, I'd like to name first of all Maria João Pires. Judging by the records, it was Rachmaninoff, Sofronitsky, and Lipatti. As to aesthetics, I feel most close to Vladimir Horowitz."

== Honors and awards ==
- Yehudi Menuhin Federation Competition in Salzburg, Austria
- Young Artist International Piano Competition in Los Angeles
- Ennio Porrino International Competition in Italy
- Rubinstein International Competition in France
- Beverly Hills National Auditions
- Vladimir Spivakov Award (Moscow virtuosi) in 2001
- Georgian Presidential Prize in 1999/2002,
- German Marion Dönhoff Trust Award in 2002, DAAD,
- German Academic Exchange Award in 2004
- Music Teachers National Association (MTNA) Academic Achievement Recognition of Excellence Award in 2004
- Herbert Batliner Trust Award in 2005
- USC Keyboard Studies Department Award in 2007 and 2011
- American philanthropist Carol Hogel Music Scholarship in 2008
- H.S.H. Princess Marie Aglaë of Liechtenstein
- Honoured as a Steinway Artist by Steinway & Sons in New York City in January 2013
- Honorary member of the Los Angeles Philharmonic International Committee, 2021
- International Adjudicator Award, Malaysia Gold Award Ceremony 2022, Book of Records, in Kuala Lumpur, Malaysia in October 2022
- Steinway Ensemble Artist designation conferred by Steinway & Sons, New York City August, 2023

== Teaching career ==
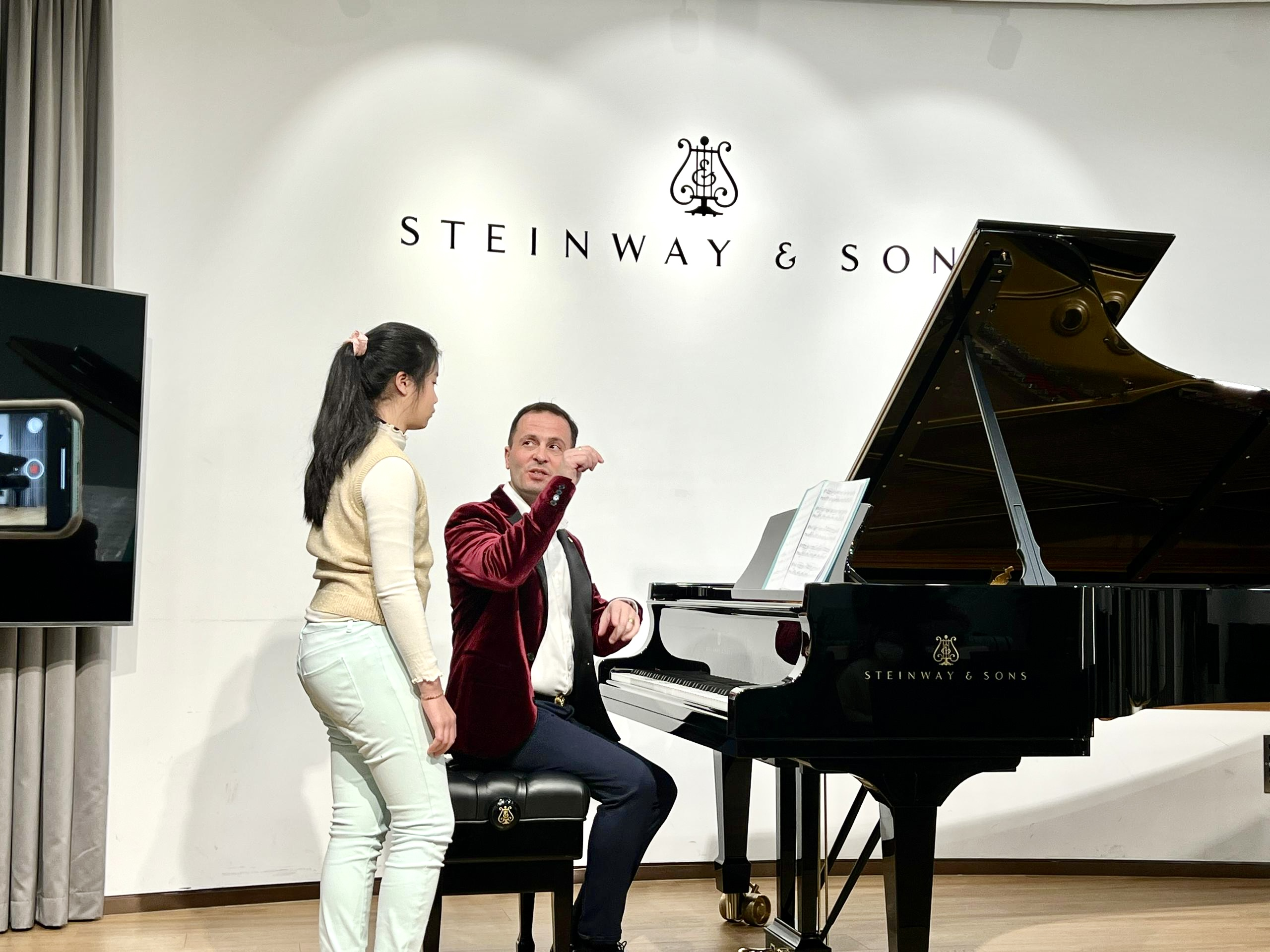
Latso conducting a masterclasses on January 26th 2024 at Steinway & Sons in Shanghai, China, third-largest global operational center after the STEINWAY factories in New York and Hamburg.

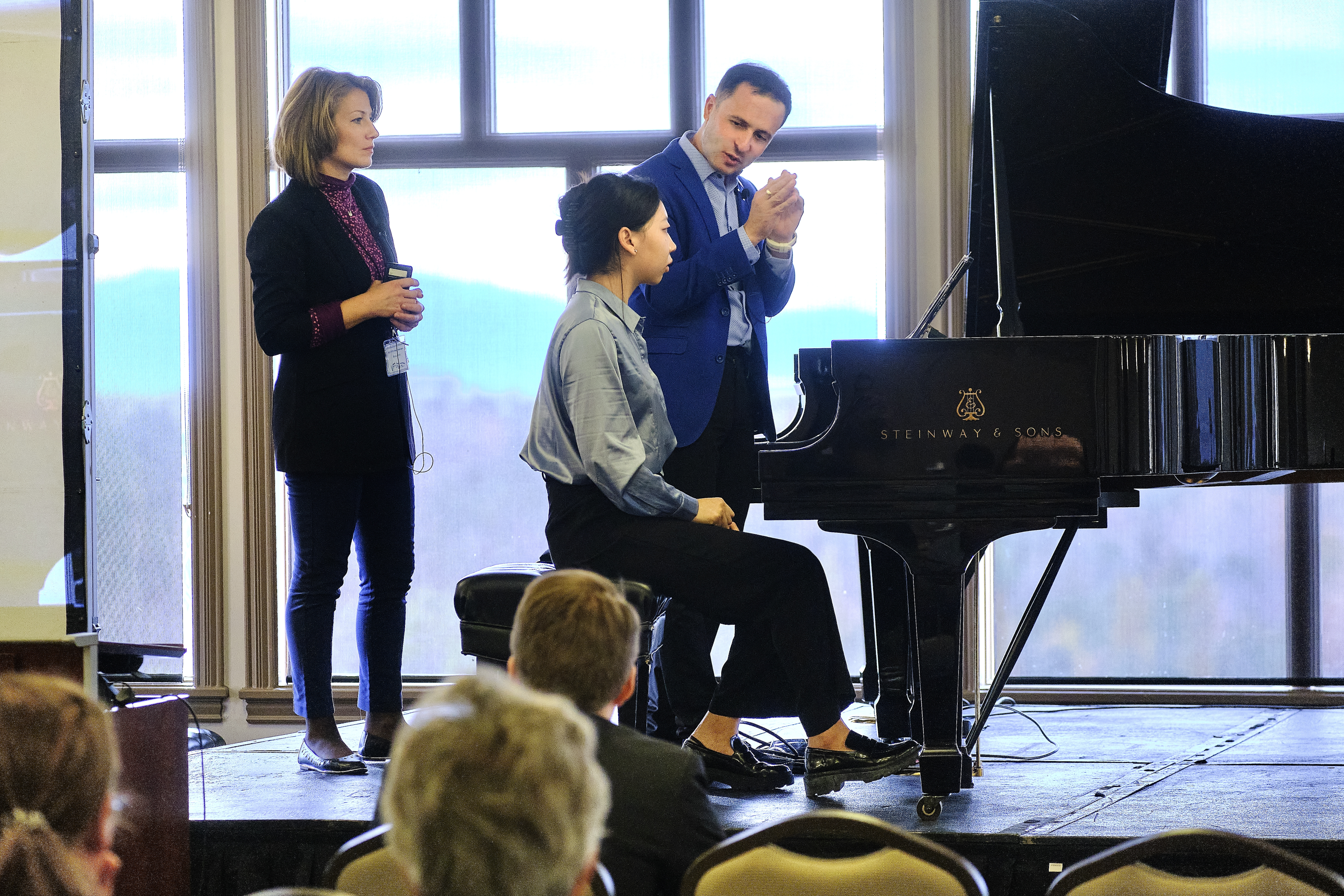
Collegiate Masterclasses at the National State Conference for Utah Music Teachers Association (2022).

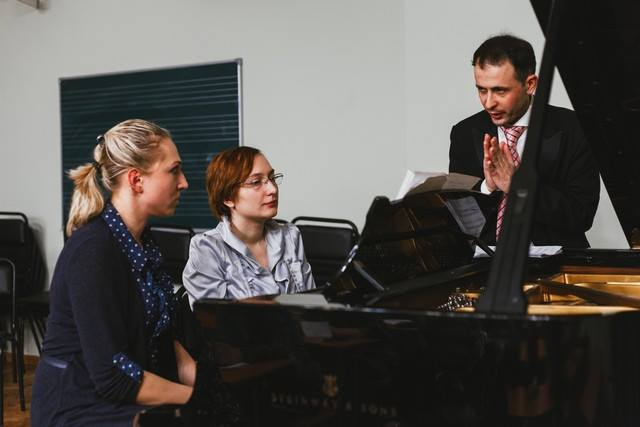
Giorgi Latso giving a Masterclasses at the Moscow Conservatory, (2017).

Latso has presented master classes and concert performances throughout Central and Eastern Europe, Asia, South America and the United States. His musical career includes being a concert pianist and collaborative artist, a professor and an international juror. From 2007 until 2010, he served as president to the USC chapter of the MTNA at the USC Thornton School of Music in Los Angeles. In 2010, Latso served as chairman for the International Piano Performance Examination Committee in Taiwan. He has taught at the University of Southern California, Azusa Pacific University, and Glendale Community College. He held professorship from 2013–2020 at the Vienna Prayner Conservatory of Music and Dramatic Arts in Vienna, Austria. In the United States he is a frequent presenter at state and local conferences of Music Teachers National Association, universities, and local music teaching groups.

== Recordings ==
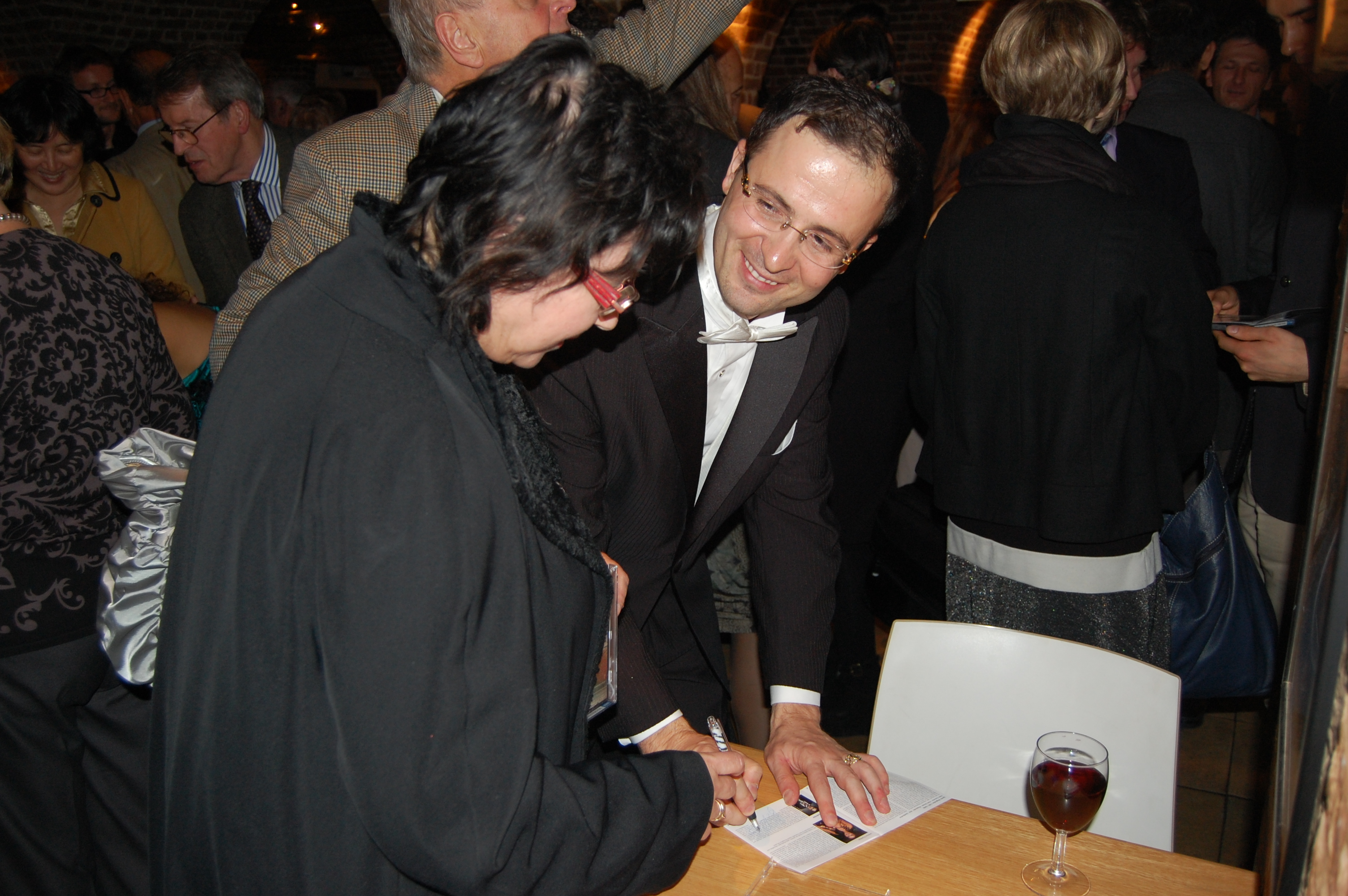
Signing session after the concert at St. John's Smith Square Concert Hall in Westminster, London (2012)

Latso has participated in numerous recordings and television productions, including DVDs and CDs of compositions by Bach, Beethoven, Mozart, Chopin, Schumann, Liszt, Rachmaninoff, Debussy, Stravinsky, and Schoenberg.

His recordings include:

- 2005: DVD: Auf den Spuren von Wolfgang Amadeus Mozart; DVD documentary on Latsabidze in Salzburg, K-TV Austria.
- 2006: DVD: Original music score composed by Latsabidze for the film Twilight's Grace, Los Angeles.
- 2008: CD: Johannes Brahms: The Piano Quintet in F minor, Op. 34. Hurb Production Studio.
- 2009: CD: Schumann: Frauenliebe und -leben; Debussy: Ariettes oubliées. IG Initiatives LLC
- 2009: CD/DVD: Latsabidze: The Recital; Onward Entertainment, Los Angeles.
- 2010: DVD: The IG-Duo performs works by Szymanowski, Brahms, Bizet-Waxman, Latsabidze. Red Piranha Films. Wigmore Hall, UK.
- 2010: CD/DVD: Giorgi Latsabidze plays Claude Debussy; 12 Préludes (Book II). Charismartist Int. Rec.
- 2011: DVD: Mozart Piano Concerto No. 21 in C major, K. 467. Taiwan Production
- 2011: CD/DVD: Frédéric Chopin: 24 Preludes, Op. 28; Robert Schumann: Kreisleriana, Op. 16. Goyette Records Co.
- 2011: CD: Giorgi Latsabidze: The Composer & Transcriber. Rhapsody Library Records
- 2012: CD: Waghalter, I.: Violin Concerto / Rhapsody / Violin Sonata (Royal Philharmonic Orchestra, Trynkos, Latsabidze, A. Walker). Naxos Records
- 2013: DVD: documentary: Piano for Piggies and Hubbard Hall Project General Films, New York.
- 2014: CD: Latso plays Debussy's Estampes & Images (1ere série). Ross Management & Productions.
- 2016: CD: Chopin: 4 Scherzi.
- 2017: CD: Giorgi Latso - "Der Pianist".
- 2019: "The Latsos Piano Duo" - Documentary film featured by Beverly Hills Warner Cable Television.

Performances are available via social networking sites of Latso's interpretation of Mozart's Piano Concerto No. 21, Chopin's 24 Preludes, Op. 28, Liszt's 12 Transcendental Études, Horowitz's Carmen Variations (White House Edition), Debussy's Préludes (Book II), and Sousa–Horowitz–Latsabidze's "The Stars and Stripes Forever".
