= List of compositions by Alan Bush =

The compositional career of the British composer Alan Bush extended from the early 1920s to the mid-1980s. He died aged 94 in 1995. His oeuvre includes large-scale orchestral and/or choral works, operas and other theatrical music, chamber music, piano works, brass band arrangements and songs. This list of his compositions is mainly drawn from the list included in Alan Bush: Music, Politics and Life (Thames Publishing, London 2000), pp. 146–164. Details that are not given in this main source have been added on the basis of information provided in the "Compositions" pages of the Alan Bush Music Trust website.

A separate listing is given of the shorter songs and choruses composed or arranged by Bush for the Workers' Music Association and other choirs with which he was associated during his working life.

== List of compositions by genre ==
Genre	Year of composition	Opus No.	Title	Musical forces	First performance	Notes	Addit. refs
Piano and keyboard	1921	1	Three Pieces for Two Pianos: 1. "On the Warpath"; 2. "Pastoral Scene"; 3. "At the Cinema"	Two pianos	London, 2 March 1921	No. 3 published also for solo piano	
Piano and keyboard	1921	2	Sonata in B Minor	Solo piano	London, 6 July 1921		
Piano and keyboard	1927	9	Prelude and Fugue	Solo piano	London, 21 June 1927		
Piano and keyboard	1928	11	Relinquishment	Solo piano	Berlin, 1928		
Piano and keyboard	1935		Theme for Organ			One of 4 themes submitted to an Organ Music Society project. (Note: Benjamin Britten, Constant Lambert and William Walton also contributed to the project, for the improvisation of a four movement work in the form of a symphony by the organist André Marchal.)	
Piano and keyboard	1943	38	Esquisse: Le Quartorze Juillet	Solo piano	London, 17 February 1948, Kyla Greenbaum	Written in commemoration of the French resistance movement	
Piano and keyboard	1950		Times of Day: Three children's pieces for piano				
Piano and keyboard	1952	40	Three English Song Preludes	Organ	London, 21 April 1954		
Piano and keyboard	1956	46	Nocturne: piano solo		London, 21 March 1958	Originally in 3 movements, two withdrawn. Piece recomposed as an orchestral work, Op. 60	
Piano and keyboard	1958	49	Mister Playford's Tunes - A Little Suite for Piano				
Piano and keyboard	1958	50	Two Ballads of the Sea : 1. "The Cruel Sea captain"; 2. "Reuben Ranzo"	Solo piano	London, 19 November 1961	Dedicated to John Ireland	
Piano and keyboard	1960	54	Suite: On Lawn and Green	Harpsichord or piano	Berlin, 1960		
Piano and keyboard	1960	56	Two Occasional Pieces	Organ			
Piano and keyboard	1967	65	Suite for two pianos		London, 2 September 1967	Composed for Soviet Union 50th anniversary concert	
Piano and keyboard	1970	71	Sonata (No. 2) in A flat: He Epikureia Hedone	Solo piano	Bath, 28 May 1972		
Piano and keyboard	1972	76	Toccata: Corentyne Kwe-Kwe	Solo piano	Bromsgrove, 2 April 1973 (Note: The Bromsgrove date is given by the Alan Bush Music Trust The Nancy Bush listing places the first performance in London, undated.)		
Piano and keyboard	1972		Lively Minuet	Solo piano			
Piano and keyboard	1974	80	Letter Galliard	Solo piano	London, 11 January 1976	Written as a tribute to Dmitri Shostakovich	
Piano and keyboard	1977	84	Twenty Four Preludes	Solo piano	London, 30 October 1977		
Piano and keyboard	1979	90	Souvenir D'Une Nuit d'Été			A recomposition of two Transcendental Studies by Sergei Lyapunov	
Piano and keyboard	1981–82	95	Scots Jigganspiel	Solo piano			
Piano and keyboard	1983	97	A Song from the North	Solo piano	Altringham, 6 May 1983		
Piano and keyboard	1980–83	99	Six Short Pieces for piano		London, 10 January 1986		
Piano and keyboard	1984	114	Three Easy Five Beat First Year Pieces		Solo piano		
Piano and keyboard	1986	109a	Distant Fields	Solo piano			
Piano and keyboard	1986	113	Sonata No. 3 in G (Mixolydian)	Solo piano	London 28 October 1986		
Piano and keyboard	1986	115	Three Pieces For Nancy	Solo piano			
Piano and keyboard	1986	116	Prelude and Concert Piece	Organ	Radlett, December 1986		
Piano and keyboard	1986	117	Suite for Organ	Organ			
Piano and keyboard	1987	118	Sonata for Organ	Organ			
Piano and keyboard	1987	118a	Two Études for solo piano				
Piano and keyboard	1987	119	Sonata No. 4 for solo piano		London 1991		
Piano and keyboard	1987	119a	The Six Modes for piano duet		London 1991		
Piano and keyboard	1987	121	A Heart's Expression for solo piano			Incomplete: dedicated to Nancy Bush	
Piano and keyboard	1987	123	Two Preludes and Fugues for solo piano				
Piano and keyboard	1988	124	Two Pieces for solo piano: "Spring Woodland" and "Summer Garden"				
Piano and keyboard	undated		Sonata for pianoforte			Incomplete	
Chamber/instrumental	1923	3	Phantasy in C minor	Violin and piano	London, 24 December 1924		
Chamber/instrumental	1923	4	String Quartet in A Minor		London, 4 December 1924	Carnegie award from the Royal Academy of Music	
Chamber/instrumental	1923		Priscilla's Pavane	Cello and piano			
Chamber/instrumental	1924–25	5	Quartet for Piano, Violin, Viola and Cello		London, 24 May 1927	According to N. Bush 2000, two movements had been heard in 1924 – no further details	
Chamber/instrumental	1925–26	6	Five Pieces for Violin, Viola, Cello, Clarinet and Horn		Berlin, 1928	Dedicated to John Ireland	
Chamber/instrumental	1929	15	Dialectic for String Quartet		London, 29 March 1935		
Chamber/instrumental	1931	13.2	Three Contrapuntal Studies	Violin and Viola	London, 10 March 1933		
Chamber/instrumental	1936	17	Concert Piece for Cello and Piano		London, January 1937		
Chamber/instrumental	1941	22a	Meditation on a German Song of 1848	Violin and Piano	London, 15 May 1944	See also Op. 22 in Concerto section, below	
Chamber/instrumental	1944	26	Lyric Interlude	Violin and Piano	London, 6 January 1945		
Chamber/instrumental	1947	31	Three Concert Studies	Piano, Violin and Cello	London, 13 February 1948		
Chamber/instrumental	1951	36	Trent's Broad Reaches	Horn and Piano	London, 18 January 1955	Written as a tribute to Noel Mewton-Wood	
Chamber/instrumental	1951		Two Easy Pieces	Cello and Piano			
Chamber/instrumental	1953	42a	Northumbrian Impressions	Oboe and Piano	London, 14 December 1953		
Chamber/instrumental	1954	45	Autumn Poem	Horn and Piano	London, 28 January 1955	Written as a tribute to Noel Mewton-Wood	
Chamber/instrumental	1957	47	Two Melodies for Viola with Piano Accompaniment		London, 8 January 1959		
Chamber/instrumental	1960	55	Three African Sketches	Flute and piano	London, 19 November 1961		
Chamber/instrumental	1961	59	Three Rậga Melodies	Solo violin	Bracknell, 25 April 1980		
Chamber/instrumental	1963–64	61	Prelude, Air and Dance	Solo Violin, String Quartet and Percussion	London, 28 April 1964		
Chamber/instrumental	1965	64	Two Dances for Cimbalom (Két Tànc)		London, 10 March 1965	Commissioned by the British Hungarian Friendship Society (20th anniv. of liberation)	
Chamber/instrumental	1969	70	Serenade for String Quartet		London, 17 January 1970	Dedicated to Ernst Mayer	
Chamber/instrumental	1974	78.1/ 78.2	"Song Duet and Introduction" and "Dance Duet"	Clarinet and Cello with Piano Accompaniment	Cambridge, April 1974 (Song) and April 1975 (Dance)		
Chamber/instrumental	1974	79a	Suite in English Style for String Ensemble: 1. Pavan; 2. Cheviot Rant; 3. Soliloquy; 4. March				
Chamber/instrumental	1975	81	Suite of Six for String Quartet		London, 15 December 1975		
Chamber/instrumental	1975	82	Sonatina for recorders and piano	Descant, treble and tenor recorders (one player), and piano	London, 11 January 1976		
Chamber/instrumental	1978	88	Sonatina (viola and piano)		London, 10 June 1978		
Chamber/instrumental	1979	89	Rhapsody for Cello and Piano: Pro Pace et Felicitate Generis Humani		London, 18 May 1979	Based on melodies from USA, UK and USSR. Dedicated to the British Bulgarian Friendship Society	
Chamber/instrumental	1980	91	Voices from Four Continents: Rondo for Clarinet, Cello and Piano		London, 18 May 1980		
Chamber/instrumental	1980	93.2	Meditation and Scherzo	Double Bass and Piano	London, 11 December 1980		
Chamber/instrumental	1980–81	94	Concertino for Two Violins and Piano		Aldeburgh, 18 June 1981		
Chamber/instrumental	1983	100	Summer Fields and Hedgerows: Two Impressions for Clarinet and Piano			Dedicated to Nancy Bush	
Chamber/instrumental	1983	105	Octet	Flute, Clarinet, Horn, String Quartet and Piano			
Chamber/instrumental	1984–85	104	Quintet	String Quartet and Piano	Birmingham, 12 December 1985		
Chamber/instrumental	1985	106	Canzona	Flute, Clarinet, Violin, Cello and Piano			
Chamber/instrumental	1986	108	Two Preludes and Fugues for Violin and Piano				
Chamber/instrumental	1986	111	Serenade and Duet for Violin and Piano			According to Alan Bush this work was scored for piano and string orchestra, but no manuscript of this version has been located	
Chamber/instrumental	1986	117a	Song and Dance for Violin and Piano			Op. 117 had been allocated by Bush to the Suite for Organ so this became 117a	
Chamber/instrumental	1987	118	Septet	Flute, Oboe, Clarinet, Bassoon and String Trio			
Chamber/instrumental	1987	120	Sonata for Cello and Piano				
Chamber/instrumental	1988	125	Summer Valley	Cello and Piano			
Chamber/instrumental	undated		Round the World	Cello and Piano			
Choral and vocal	1926	7	Two Songs for soprano and chamber orchestra: 1. The Moth (Walter de la Mare); 2. Overheard on a Saltmarsh (Harold Monro)				
Choral and vocal	1927		Two Songs for voice and piano: 1. The Lake Isle of Innisfree; 2. Down by the Salley Gardens (both W. B. Yeats		London, 15 June 1927		
Choral and vocal	1927–28	10	"Song to the Men of England"	Unaccompanied SATB chorus		Text by Percy Bysshe Shelley. Written for the London Labour Choral Union.	
Choral and vocal	1928		Cradle Song for an Unwanted Child	Voice and piano		Text by Randall Swingler	
Choral and vocal	1929	13	Song: "The Road"	Unaccompanied SATB chorus			
Choral and vocal	1932–33	14	Songs of the Doomed - four songs and an epilogue	Tenor (or baritone), female chorus (SSAA) and piano	London, 8 March 1933	Text: poems by F.C. Boden	
Choral and vocal	1939	19	The Prison Cycle, also known as Pages from "The Swallow Book")	Mezzo-Soprano and piano	London, 15 December 1939	Co-written with Alan Rawsthorne	
Choral and vocal	1942		"Toulon"	Mezzo-Soprano with SATB chorus and piano	London, 26 May 1943		
Choral and vocal	1943		"Freedom on the March"	Solo voice, mixed chorus and Symphony Orchestra	London, 27 June 1943		
Choral and vocal	1946	29	Cantata: The Winter Journey	Soprano and baritone soli, SATB chorus, string quintet, harp or piano	Alnwick, December 1946	Text by Randall Swingler	
Choral and vocal	1947		Lidice	Unaccompanied SATB chorus	Lidice, August 1947		
Choral and vocal	1948		"Our Song"	Mezzo-Soprano or baritone solo, SATB chorus and piano accompaniment	Nottingham, 7 November 1948	Commissioned for the opening of the Nottingham Co-operative Arts Centre	
Choral and vocal	1949	34	"Song of Friendship"	Bass solo, SATB chorus and orchestra	London, 6 November 1949	Written for the British Soviet Friendship Society	
Choral and vocal	1950	35	The Dream of Llewelyn Ap Gruffydd	Male voice chorus and piano	Treorchy, 11 April 1952		
Choral and vocal	1950		The People's Paper	Solo voice, SATB chorus and 0rchestra	London, 12 February 1950	Written in celebratation of the 21st anniversary of The Daily Worker	
Choral and vocal	1953	41	Cantata: Voices of the Prophets	Tenor voice and piano	London, 22 May 1953	Dedicated to Peter Pears and Noel Mewton-Wood	
Choral and vocal	1953		Ten English Folk Songs	Mixed voice chorus, with or without piano accompanimant			
Choral and vocal	1953	44	Cantata: The Ballad of Freedom's Soldier	Tenor and bass-baritone soli, SATB chorus and orchestra	Russe, Bulgaria, 5 April 1962	Written in memory of Major Frank Thompson, who died in action in Bulgaria in 1944	
Choral and vocal	1957	44	Part song: "Like Rivers Flowing"	Unaccompanied SATB chorus			
Choral and vocal	1958	51	The World is his Song	Baritone or mezzo-soprano solo, SATB chorus and instrumental ensemble	London, 15 February 1959	Dedicated to Paul Robeson	
Choral and vocal	1958		Ballade vom Marsch auf Aldermaston	Speaker, SATB chorus and instrumental ensemble	Weimar, 1958		
Choral and vocal	1958		Nicht den Tod aus der Ferne	Baritone solo, unison chorus and instrumental ensemble	Weimar, 1958		
Choral and vocal	1961	57	Four Seafarers' Songs: 1. "The Ship in Distress"; 2. "Ratcliffe Highway"; 3. "The Greenland Fishery"; 4. "Jack and the Jolly Tar"	Baritone with piano accompaniment	London, 19 November 1961		
Choral and vocal	1961		"Song of the Cosmonaut"	Baritone solo, and mixed chorus and piano accompaniment		Dedicated to Yuri Gagarin	
Choral and vocal	1961		"The Tide That Will Never Turn "	Two speakers, bass or baritone solo, SATB Chorus	London, 1 April 1961	Text by Hugh MacDiarmid	
Choral and vocal	1963	62	Part song: "During Music"	Unaccompanied SATB chorus	London, 4 April 1964		
Choral and vocal	1968	66	Cantata: The Alps and Andes of the Living World	Speaker, tenor solo, SATB chorus and orchestra	Dartington, 9 August 1968	Incorporates text by William Shakespeare, Thomas Huxley and Nancy Bush	
Choral and vocal	1969	69	Song cycle: The Freight of Harvest	Tenor and piano	Dartington, 8 August 1969		
Choral and vocal	1969		Songs of Asian Struggle	SATB chorus and piano accompaniment	London, 17 January 1970		
Choral and vocal	1971	72	Men of Felling	Male chorus with piano accompaniment	Newcastle, 15 October 1971		
Choral and vocal	1972		Carol: "The Earth Awakening"'	Female chorus with organ accompaniment	Cambridge, 18 December 1972		
Choral and vocal	1972		Part song: "Earth has Grain to Grow "	Unaccompanied SATB chorus		Text by Cecil Day Lewis	
Choral and vocal	1972	75	Part song: "Song for Angela Davis "	Unaccompanied SATB chorus or unison song with piano accompaniment	Sheffield, 25 August 1972		
Choral and vocal	1958, 1961, 1974	79	Song cycle: Life's Span	Mezzo-soprano and piano	Bromsgrove, 4 April 1973		
Choral and vocal	1973	85	Africa is My Name	Mezzo-soprano solo, SATB chorus, piano or orchestra	Sheffield, 20 August 1976		
Choral and vocal	1976–77	86	Song cycle: De Plenos Poderes	Baritone and piano	London, 30 October 1977		
Choral and vocal	1977	87	Song cycle: Woman's Life	Soprano and piano	Woking, 12 February 1978		
Choral and vocal	1980	92	Two Shakespeare Sonnets (nos 18 and 60)	Baritone and chamber orchestra	London, 5 August 1981		
Choral and vocal	1985	102	The Earth in Shadow	SATB chorus and orchestra	London, 1985		
Choral and vocal	1985	101	Turkish Workers' Marching Song	Unison Chorus, Flute, Clarinet, Trumpet, Tenor Trombone, Piano, Timpani (optional) and Percussion			
Choral and vocal	1985	110	Mandela Speaking	Baritone solo, SATB chorus, orchestra or piano	London, 1985		
Choral and vocal	undated		Cantata: The Youth Railway	Soprano and baritone solo, mixed chorus, acc. string quintet with harp or piano			
Orchestral/Concerto	1922		Festival March for Chamber Orchestra	2 cornets in Bb, 2 horns, timpani, percussion (2), strings and organ	London, 17 July 1922	Unpublished work, a contribution to "A Wreath of A Hundred Roses" by Louis Napoleon Parker to mark the Royal Academy of Music centenary	
Orchestral/Concerto	1926–27	8	Symphonic Impressions for Orchestra		London, 15 November 1929		
Orchestral/Concerto	1935	12	Dance Overture		London, 30 August 1935		
Orchestral/Concerto	1935–37	18	Piano Concerto		London, 4 March 1938 (BBC broadcast)	Last movement uses text by Randall Swingler	
Orchestral/Concerto	1939-40	21	Symphony No. 1 in C		London, 24 July 1942	Last movement revised as Defender of the Peace - Character Study for Orchestra, Op. 39 (1952)	
Orchestral/Concerto	1941	22	Meditation on a German Song of 1848	Solo Violin and String Orchestra	6 December 1941		
Orchestral/Concerto	1942	23	Overture: Festal Day (later retitled Birthday Overture)		London, 12 October 1942	Written for Ralph Vaughan Williams's 70th birthday	
Orchestral/Concerto	1942	24	Fantasia on Soviet Themes		London, 27 July 1945		
Orchestral/Concerto	1946	25	Overture: "Resolution"		Bedford, 1 February 1946	Based on Prologue for a Workers' Meeting for brass band, Op. 16 (1935)	
Orchestral/Concerto	1945–46	27	Homage to William Sterndale Bennett	String Orchestra	London, 9 February 1946	Based on Piano Sonata The Maid of Orleans by William Sterndale Bennett	
Orchestral/Concerto	1945–46	28	English Suite	String Orchestra	London, 9 February 1946		
Orchestral/Concerto	1946–47	30	Symphonic Suite: Piers Plowman's Day		Prague, October 1947 (radio broadcast)		
Orchestral/Concerto	1946–48	32	Violin Concerto		London, 25 August 1949	Dedicated to Max Rostal who performed the premiere	
Orchestral/Concerto	1949	33	Symphony No. 2: "The Nottingham Symphony"		Nottingham, 27 June 1949	commissioned by the Nottingham Co-operative Society to celebrate 500th anniversary of the city's founding	
Orchestral/Concerto	1952	37	Concert Suite for Cello and Orchestra		Budapest, 1952		
Orchestral/Concerto	1952	39	Defender of the Peace – Character Study for Orchestra		Vienna, 24 May 1952	Re-composition of last movement of Symphony No. 1, Op. 21 (1939–40)	
Orchestral/Concerto	1955		Allegro Molto		London, 16 May 1955	Part of a set of variations by eight composers on a theme by Alfred Scott-Gatty	
Orchestral/Concerto	1959	52	Dorian Passacaglia and Fugue for Orchestra		London, 10 June 1961		
Orchestral/Concerto	1959–60	53	Symphony No. 3: "The Byron Symphony"	Orch. with baritone and SATB chorus	Leipzig, 20 March 1962	G. F. Handel prize work, presented by the City Council of Halle in 1962	
Orchestral/Concerto	1961	58	"For a Festal Occasion", for Organ and Orchestra		Hereford, 3 September 1961	An arrangement of Two Occasional Pieces for Organ, Op. 56 (1960)	
Orchestral/Concerto	1962	60	Variations, Nocturne and Finale on an English Sea-Song	Piano and Orchestra	Cheltenham, 7 July 1965	Originally written as piano solo: Nocturne, Op. 46 (1956)	
Orchestral/Concerto	1965	63	Partita Concertante		Dartford, May 1975		
Orchestral/Concerto	1968	67	"Time Remembered" for Chamber Orchestra		Cheltenham, 8 July 1969		
Orchestral/Concerto	1969	68	Scherzo for Wind Orchestra with Percussion	Brass, wind and percussion	London, 29 July 1969		
Orchestral/Concerto	1972	73	Africa – Symphonic Movement	Piano and Orchestra	Halle, 16 October 1972		
Orchestral/Concerto	1971–72	74	Concert Overture for an Occasion		London, 5 July 1972	Written for RAM sesquicentennial (150 yrs) celebrations	
Orchestral/Concerto	1973	77	The Liverpool Overture		Liverpool, 1 May 1973	Commissioned by Liverpool trades Council for their 125th anniversary	
Orchestral/Concerto	1973	78	Festival March of British Youth	Wind Orchestra, Guitars, Percussion and Double Bass	Berlin, August 1973		
Orchestral/Concerto	1981–82	96	Song and Dance for Junior String Orchestra				
Orchestral/Concerto	1982–83	98	Symphony No. 4 - '"Lascaux Symphony"		Manchester, 25 March 1986	Inspired by a visit to the prehistoric cave paintings at Lascaux, France	
Orchestral/Concerto	1985	107	Meditation for Orchestra in Memory of Anna Ambrose				
Orchestral/Concerto	1986	109	Song Poem and Dance Poem	Piano and String Orchestra			
Brass, wind and pipes	1930	12a	Dance Overture for Military Band		London, 25 April 1931		
Brass, wind and pipes	1935	16	Prologue to a Workers' Meeting, for Brass Orchestra			Later re-written as the "Resolution" Overture for Orchestra, Op. 25 (1943)	
Brass, wind and pipes	1942	20	"Russian Glory" for military band		London, 15 March 1943	Based on "Song of the Fatherland" (Isaac Dunayevsky) and the Trio from "Song of Stalin" (Aram Khachaturian)	
Brass, wind and pipes	1942		Fantasia on Soviet Themes for Military Band		London, 15 March 1943	"Dedicated in affectionate homage to Madame Agnes Maisky, for so long the gracious representative of the Soviet People, as a humble tribute to whom this work is designed."	
Brass, wind and pipes	1945–46		"The Cutty Wren"	Brass band		Arrangement	
Brass, wind and pipes	1953	42	Three Northumbrian Impressions for Northumbrian Small Pipes		London, 28 October 1979	See also "Northumbrian Impressions for Oboe and Piano", Op. 42a	
Brass, wind and pipes	1953	43	Pavane for the Castleton Queen, for Brass Band		Castelton, Derbyshire, 1953		
Brass, wind and pipes	1976	83	Suite for pipes: "Compass Points"	Treble, alto, tenor and bass bamboo pipes	Canterbury, August 1976		
Stage/screen	1935		Ballet: His War or Yours	3 trumpets, 3 trombones, tuba and percussion	London, 28 March 1936	Scenario by Michael Tippett	
Stage/screen	1935		Ballet: Mining		London, undated	Scenario by Michael Tippett	
Stage/screen	1940		Incidental theatre music: The Star Turns Red	3 trumpets, percussion(2), violin and piano	London, 12 March 1940	Incidental music to the play by Seán O'Casey at the Unity Theatre	
Stage/screen	1942		Incidental theatre music: The Duke in Darkness		London, 8 October 1942	Incidental music to the play by Patrick Hamilton at the Aldwych Theatre	
Stage/screen	1946		Operetta The Press Gang or The Escap'd Apprentice		St.Christopher's School, Letchworth, 7 March 1947	Operetta for children, text by Nancy Bush	
Stage/screen	1947		Incidental theatre music: Macbeth (Shakespeare)		London, 18 December 1947	Aldwych Theatre production by Michael Redgrave	
Stage/screen	1948–50		Opera: Wat Tyler		Leipzig, 6 September 1953	Libretto: Nancy Bush. Commissioned by the Arts Council of Great Britain in the Festival of Britain Opera Competition	
Stage/screen	1953–55		TV film music: Hiroshima	Flute and harp	BBC transmission 15 August 1951		
Stage/screen	1953		Operetta The Spell Unbound		Bournemouth, 6 March 1955	Operetta for girls. Text by Nancy Bush	
Stage/screen	1954–55		Opera: Men of Blackmoor		Weimar, 18 November 1956	Libretto: Nancy Bush	
Stage/screen	1961		Operetta The Ferryman's Daughter		Letchworth, 6 March 1964	Operetta for schools. Text by Nancy Bush	
Stage/screen	1962–65		Opera: The Sugar Reapers		Leipzig, 11 December 1966	Also known as Guyana Johnnie. Libretto: Nancy Bush	
Stage/screen	1965–67		Opera: Joe Hill - The Man Who Never Died		Berlin, 29 September 1970	Libretto: Barry Stavis	
Stage/screen	1971		Film soundtrack: Fifty Fighting Years	Piano, percussion, strings and chorus	Film premiere National Film Theatre, London, 10 June 1973		
Pageant	1934		"The Pageant of Labour"	Mixed chorus and orchestra	London, 15 October 1934	Organised by the Central Women's Organisation Committee to the London Trades Council.	
Pageant	1938		"Towards Tomorrow" - A Pageant of Co-operation	Mixed chorus and military band	London, 2 July 1938	Performed by members of the London/South Suburban/Watford Co-operative Societies	
Pageant	1939		"Festival of Music for the People"	Brass, woodwind, percussion and organ	London, 1 April 1939		
Pageant	1946		"The Living English"	SATB choir, children's chorus, small orchestra	London, 26 October 1946	Part of the 1946 Folk Song and Dance Festival	
Pageant	1948		Communist Manifesto Centenary Pageant	Mixed choir and military band	London, April 1948		

== Songs and arrangements ==
The Alan Bush Music Trust

- 1926 "Song to Labour"
- 1930 "Song to Freedom"
- 1931 "Question and Answer "
- 1934 "Song of the Hunger Marchers"
- 1935 "Red Front"
- 1936 "Labour's Song of Challenge"
- 1939 "Make your Meaning Clear "
- 1939 "Against the People's Enemies "
- 1939 "Song of the Peace-Lovers "
- 1940 "The Ice Breaks"
- 1940 "Freedom on the Air"
- 1940 "March of the Workers "
- 1941 "Unite And Be Free"
- 1942 "Britain's Part "
- 1944 "Comrade Dear, Come Home "
- 1944 "Song of the Commons of England"
- 1946 Twenty "Sing for Pleasure" songs accompanied or unaccompanied singing
- 1946 "A World for Living "
- 1948 "The Internationale" (arrangement)
- 1950 "Shining Vision : Song for Peace "
- 1969 Four songs of Asian struggle (arrangements)
- 1982 "N'kosi Sikeleli Afrika" (African National Congress Anthem) (arrangement)
- 1985 "It's up to Us"
- undated: "From the Five Continents
- undated: Miscellaneous Folk Song Arrangements (published 1965)
- undated: "Once is Enough"
- undated: "Song of Age "
- undated: "Song of the Engineers"
- undated: "Song of the Peatbog Soldiers" (arrangement of song written in a German concentration camp)
- undated: "The Sailor"
- undated: "There's a Reason" (published 1971)
- undated: "Till Right is Done"
