= Jack Lindsay =

Australian writer (1900–1990)

Jack Lindsay AM FRSL
- Born: John Lindsay; 20 October 1900; Melbourne, Colony of Victoria (now Victoria, Australia)
- Died: 8 March 1990 (aged 89); Cambridge, Cambridgeshire, England, UK
- Occupations: Writer; poet; biographer; translator; essayist; editor
- Spouse: Janet (m. 1922)
- Partner: Ann Davies (from 1943, d. 1954)
- Writing career
- Language: English
- Genres: Novels, plays, short stories, non-fiction
- Notable awards: Order of the Badge of Honour (USSR, 1967); Member of the Order of Australia (Australia, 1981)
- Movement: Realism
- Website: jacklindsayproject.com

John Lindsay AM, FRSL (20 October 1900 – 8 March 1990) was an Australian-born writer. He was born in Melbourne, but spent his formative years in Brisbane. He was the eldest son of Norman Lindsay and brother of author Philip Lindsay.

== Early life ==
John Lindsay was born on 20 October 1900 in Melbourne, Colony of Victoria. He was educated at Brisbane Grammar School and the University of Queensland under J. L. Michie, from which he graduated with first class honours in Greek and Latin. On 27 October 1922 at the district registrar's office, Waverton, he married Janet Beaton, granddaughter of W. B. Dalley. He started his literary career in 1923 as a poet with a book Fauns and Ladies, illustrated by his father. In the 1920s he contributed stories and poems to a popular weekly magazine, The Bulletin, as well as editing the literary magazines Vision (with his father Norman) and London Aphrodite.

Lindsay founded, with P. R. Stephensen and John Kirtley, the Fanfrolico Press for fine publishing, initially in North Sydney. He left Australia in 1926, never to return.

== In the UK ==
Lindsay and P. R. Stephensen established two short-lived magazines, Vision and The London Aphrodite, which were published by the Fanfrolico Press in the 1920s. In the 1930s, the Fanfrolico Press ceased as a business. Lindsay later described that experience in the autobiographical work Fanfrolico and After (1962). He moved to the left politically, writing for Left Review and joining the Communist Party of Great Britain at the end of the decade, becoming an activist.

While living in Cornwall, Lindsay started writing novels, with his earliest ones set in Ancient Greece and the Roman Empire; they included Cressida's First Lover (1931), Rome For Sale, and Caesar Is Dead (both 1934). Lindsay's historical fiction also includes 1649: A Novel of a Year (1938), a social realist work that begins with the execution of Charles I of England and explores the first year of the Republic through the eyes of ordinary citizens. He wrote it as an anti-fascist novel. He collaborated with Edgell Rickword amongst others. In 1937, Lindsay's poem On Guard for Spain: A Poem for Mass Recitation was first staged by London's Unity Theatre before going on to be performed across Britain as part of the movement in support of the Spanish Republic. He wrote extra stanzas at Unity's request.

During World War II, Lindsay served in the British Army initially in the Royal Signal Corps. From 1943, he worked for the War Office on theatrical scripts. That year, he began an affair with the actor and activist Ann Davies which was announced as a marriage although Lindsay was still married. Ann was popularly known as Ann Lindsay. Ann died in 1954.

After the war Lindsay lived in Castle Hedingham, becoming the subject of defamation and suppression because of his Communist standpoint. Being a prolific writer, he published 169 books including 38 novels and 25 volumes of translations (from Latin, Greek, Russian, and Polish), as well as art, literary, classical, historical and political studies, biographies and autobiographies written from a Marxist perspective.

Lindsay was a vegetarian for all his adult life.

== Awards ==
Lindsay was awarded the Soviet Order of the Badge of Honour in 1967, and an Honorary Doctor of Letters by the University of Queensland in 1973. He was elected a Fellow of the Royal Society of Literature (1946), the Australian Academy of the Humanities (1982), and appointed a Member of the Order of Australia (1981).

== Works ==
=== Fanfrolico Press books, as translator, author or editor ===
- Lysistrata by Aristophanes (1925). Illustrated by Norman Lindsay
- The Mimiambs of Herodas (1929). Translated by Jack Lindsay, Decorated by Alan Odle, with a foreword by Brian Penton.
- A Defence of Women for their Inconstancy & their Paintings by Jack Donne (1925)
- The Passionate Neatherd. A lyric sequence (1926)
- Marino Faliero (1927). Drama
- William Blake; Creative Will and the Poetic Image (1927)
- The Metamorphosis of Aiax by Sir John Harington (1927). Editor with Peter Warlock
- Propertius in Love (1927) translator
- Loving Mad Tom: Bedlamite Verses of the XVI and XVII Centuries (1927). Illustrations by Norman Lindsay
- Helen comes of age. Three Plays (1927)
- The Complete Works of Gaius Petronius Done into English By Jack Lindsay with one Hundred Illustrations by Norman Lindsay; Comprising the Satyricon and Poems (1927, privately printed for sale to subscribers only)
- The Parlement of Pratlers by John Eliot (1928). Editor, illustrated by Hal Collins
- Homage to Sappho (1928)
- Inspirations. An anthology of utterances by Creative Minds defining the creative act and its lyrical basis in life (1928). Editor
- The Complete Works of Thomas Lovell Beddoes edited with a memoir by Sir Edmund Gosse and decorated by the Dance of Death of Holbein (1928). Editor
- Dionysos: Nietzsche Contra Nietzsche. An Essay in Lyrical Philosophy (1928)
- Homer's Hymns to Aphrodite (1929)
- Hereward. A Play (1929, music by John Gough)
- Women in Parliament by Aristophanes (1929). Illustrations by Norman Lindsay, foreword by Edgell Rickword
- Theocritos, The Complete Poems (1929). Introduction by Edward Hutton, illustrations by Lionel Ellis
- The Complete Poetry of Gaius Catullus (1930). Editor
- Morgan in Jamaica (1930)
- Patchwork Quilt. Poems by Decimus Magnus Ausonius (1930). Translator, illustrations by Edward Bawden

=== To 1929 ===
- Fauns and Ladies (1923). Poems
- Poetical Sketches by William Blake. With an Essay on Blake's Metric by Jack Lindsay. (Scholartis Press 1927)
- The Modern Consciousness: An Essay Towards an Integration (1928)
- I See the Earth: Poems by Elza De Locre, Illustrated by Peter Meadows (pseudonym for Jack Lindsay), (Scholartis Press 1928)

=== 1930–1939 ===
- Cressida's First Lover (1931)
- The Complete Works of Gaius Petronius (Rarity Press, 1932). Translator, illustrated by Norman Lindsay
- The Golden Ass. (The Metamorphoses of Apuleius, Limited Editions Club, 1932). Translator, illustrated by Percival Goodman
- Medieval Latin Poets (1934)
- I am a Roman (1934)
- Rome for Sale (1934)
- Caesar is Dead (1934)
- Last Days With Cleopatra (1935)
- Despoiling Venus (1935)
- Storm at Sea (Golden Cockerel Press, 1935). Illustrated by John Farleigh
- The Romans (1935). Illustrated by Pearl Binder
- Runaway (1935). Illustrated by J Morton Sale
- Who Are the English? (1936). Poem
- Come Home at Last (1936). Short stories
- Adam of a New World (1936). A novel about Giordano Bruno
- Wanderings of Wenamem 1115-1114 B.C (1936). Novel
- Rebels of the Gold Fields (1936)
- On Guard for Spain (1937) Poem
- John Bunyan: Maker of Myths (1937)
- The Anatomy of Spirit: An Inquiry into the Origins of Religious Emotion (1937)
- Sue Verney (1937)
- Marc Anthony. His world and his contemporaries (1937)
- To Arms: A Story of Ancient Gaul (1938). Illustrated by Martin Tyas
- 1649: A Novel of a Year (1938)
- Brief Light: A Novel of Catullus (1939)
- A Handbook of Freedom: A Record of English Democracy through Twelve Centuries (1939) with Edgell Rickword, later editions as Spokesmen for Liberty
- Lost Birthright (1939)
- A Short History of Culture from Prehistory to the Renascence (1939)
- England, My England: A Pageant of the English People (Fore Publications, 1939) Key Books pamphlet No. 2

=== 1940–1949 ===
- Giuliano the Magnificent (1940). Editor, Dorothy Johnson
- Hannibal Takes a Hand (1941)
- The Stormy Violence (1941)
- Light in Italy (1941)
- Socialist Russia? (c.1941)
- We Shall Return; a Novel of Dunkirk and the French Campaign (1942)
- Into Action: the Battle of Dieppe (1942). Poem
- The Dons Sight Devon (1942)
- Beyond Terror (1943). Novel
- Perspective for Poetry (Fore Publications, 1944). Pamphlet, Key Essays No. 1
- Second Front (1944). Poems
- The Whole Armour of God (1944). Drama
- Robin of England (1944). Drama
- Marxism and Contemporary Science: or The Fullness of Life (1944)
- The Barriers Are Down (1945)
- Hullo Stranger (1945)
- New Lyrical Ballads (1945). Anthology, editor
- Jolly Swagman The Australians at Home Current Affairs No 91 (1945)
- British Achievement in Art and Music (1945)
- Time to Live (1946). Novel
- Face of Coal (1946) with B. Coombes
- The Subtle Knot (1947)
- Anvil: Life and the Arts: A Miscellany (1947). Editor
- Poems by Robert Herrick (Grey Walls Press 1948). Editor
- Selected Poems of William Morris (Grey Walls Press, 1948). Editor
- Daphnis & Chloe (1948, Daimon Press). Translator, illustrated by Lionel Ellis
- Catullus: The Complete Poems (Sylvan Press, 1948). Translator
- Men of Forty-Eight (1948)
- Song Of A Falling World: Culture During The Break Up Of The Roman Empire A.D. 350–600 (1948)
- Mulk Raj Anand: A Critical Essay (1948)
- Clue of Darkness (1949)

=== 1950–1959 ===
- Three Letters to Nikolai Tikhonov (1950, Fore Publications Key Poets No. 7). Poems
- Paintings and Drawings By Leslie Hurry (Grey Walls Press 1950). Introduction
- Charles Dickens (1950)
- A World Ahead (Fore Publications, 1950). ravel to the USSR 1949
- Fires in Smithfield – a novel of Mary Tudor's Reign (1950)
- Peace is our answer. Poems. With further prefactory poems by P. Eluard, P. Neruda, L. Aragon and a Foreword by J.G. Crowther. Linocuts by Noel Counihan (1950)
- The Passionate Pastoral: An 18th Century Escapade (1951) novel
- The USA Threat to British Culture - Special edition of ARENA No.8, June/July 1951. Editor
- Byzantium into Europe (1952)
- Rising Tide (1953). Illustrated by James Boswell
- Betrayed Spring: a novel of the British way(1953)
- Rumanian Summer: A View of the Rumanian People's Republic (1953) with Maurice Cornforth
- Civil War in England (1954)
- The Moment of Choice (1955)
- George Meredith: his Life and Work (1956)
- The Romans Were Here - The Roman Period In Britain And Its Place In Our History (1956)
- After the 'Thirties: The Novel in Britain and its Future (1956)
- Three Elegies (1956)
- A Local Habitation (1957)
- The Great Oak. A Story of 1549 (1957)
- Russian Poetry 1917–1955 (1957)
- Poems of Adam Mickiewicz (1957). Translator
- Arthur and His Times – Britain in the Dark Ages (1958)
- The Discovery of Britain: a Guide to Archaeology (1958)
- Life Rarely Tells: An Autobiographical Account Ending in the Year 1921 and Situated Mostly in Brisbane Queensland (1958) autobiography (i)
- 1764, the Hurlyburly of Daily Life Exemplified in One Year of the 18th Century (1959)
- The Loves of Asklepiades (Myriad Press, 1959). Translator, illustrated by Paul Rudall

=== 1960–1969 ===
- Death of the Hero: French Painting from David to Delacroix (1960)
- The Satyricon (1960). Translator
- Modern Russian Poetry (1960). Editor and translator
- The Roaring Twenties – Literary Life in Sydney, New South Wales in the Years 1921–1926 (1960). Autobiography (ii)
- The Writing on the Wall: An Account of the Last Days of Pompeii (1960)
- The Revolt of the Sons (1960)
- The Golden Ass of Lucius Apuleius (1960). Translator
- William Morris – Writer (1961)
- Ribaldry of Greece (1961). Editor
- Ribaldry of Rome (1961). Editor
- All on the Never Never (1961). Novel (filmed in 1962 as Live Now, Pay Later)
- Our Celtic Heritage (1962)
- Fanfrolico and After (1962). Autobiography (iii)
- Cause, Principle, and Unity: 5 Dialogues by Giordano Bruno (1962)
- Masks and Faces (1963) novel
- Daily Life in Roman Egypt (1963)
- The Way the Ball Bounces (1964) novel
- Choice of Times (1964) novel
- Nine Days' Hero; Wat Tyler (1964)
- Leisure and Pleasure in Roman Egypt (1965)
- Thunder Underground; a novel of Nero's Rome (1965)
- The Clashing Rocks: A Study of Early Greek Religion and Culture and the Origins of Drama (1965)
- Our Anglo-Saxon Heritage (1965)
- J.M.W. Turner: His Life and Work: A Critical Biography (1966)
- The Sunset Ship: Poems of J.M.W. Turner (1966). Editor
- The Elegy of Haido by Teferos Anthias (1966). Translator
- Our Roman Heritage (1967)
- The Ancient World: Manners and Morals (1968)
- Men and Gods on the Roman Nile (1968)
- Meetings with Poets. Memories of Dylan Thomas, Edith Sitwell, Aragon, Eluard & Tzara (1968)
- The Age of Akhnaten by Eleonore Bille-de-Mot (1968). Translator
- Greece, I Keep My Vigil For You by Teferos Anthias (1968). Translator
- Cézanne His Life and Art (1969)

=== 1970–1979 ===
- The Autobiography of Joseph Priestley (1970). Editor
- The Question of Totemism reopened (1970). Pamphlet
- The Origins of Alchemy in Graeco-Roman Egypt (1970)
- Cleopatra (1971)
- Origins of Astrology (1972)
- Gustave Courbet: His Life and Art (1972)
- The Normans and Their World (1973)
- Blast-Power & Ballistics Concepts of Force and Energy in the Ancient World (1974)
- Helen of Troy, Woman and Goddess (1974)
- Faces & Places (1974). Illustrated by Norman Lindsay
- Death of a Spartan King and two other stories of the Ancient World (Inca Books, 1974). Illustrated by Noel Counihan
- Decay and Renewal. Critical Essays on Twentieth Century Writing (1976)
- The Troubadours and Their World (1976)
- Hogarth; His Art and His World (1977)
- The Monster City: Defoe's London 1688–1730 (1978)
- William Blake: His Life and Work (1978)
- William Morris (1979)
- War Or Peace. Twelve linocuts by Noel Counihan. Poems by Jack Lindsay (1979)

=== 1980–1991 ===
- Collected Poems (Chiron Press, 1981)
- The Crisis In Marxism (1981)
- Thomas Gainsborough: His Life and Art (1981)
- Trinity: Music, Poems and Drawings by Jack Lindsay (1982)
- The Blood Vote (publ. 1985, written 1937). Novel
- The Mandrake Press 1929–30 (1985). Catalogue introduction
- William Morris, Dreamer of Dreams (Nine Elms Press, 1991). Essay

=== New Lyrical Ballads (1945) ===
Edited by Lindsay, Honor Arundel and Maurice Carpenter. Poets included were:

Dai Alexander – Honor Arundel – John Atkins – Maurice Carpenter – Herbert Corby – Leslie Daiken – Idris Davies – Tom Farnol – Alun Lewis – Jack Lindsay – John Manifold – Geoffrey Matthews – David Martin – Frances Mayo – Hubert Nicholson – Harold W. Owen – Paul Potts – John Pudney – Arnold Rattenbury – M. Richardson – Joyce Rowe – Francis Scarfe – John Singe – Randall Swingler – Mike Whittock

== See also ==
- Culture and history: essays presented to Jack Lindsay (1984). Edited by Bernard Smith
- Jack Lindsay: the thirties and forties (1984). Edited by Robert Mackie
- Paul Gillen. Jack Lindsay: faithful to the earth (1993)
- Lindsay, (Robert Leeson) Jack. Dictionary of Art Historians
- Obituary of Jack Lindsay: Prolific and Proletarian. The Independent (London), 13 March 1990, p. 19
- Jack Lindsay. The Times (London), 9 March 1990
- John Arnold. The Fanfrolico Press: satyrs, fauns and fine books. Pinner: Private Libraries Association, 2009 ISBN 978-0-900002-97-7
- Paul Gillen. Lindsay, John (Jack). The article originally published in Australian Dictionary of Biography, Volume 18, (MUP), 2012
- Jack Lindsay: Poet Of The Crisis Years. The Morning Star (London), 28 October 2014. Page saved by the Wayback Machine
- The Jack Lindsay Project. Retrieved 21 November 2017
