= Ken Sprague (cartoonist) =

English political cartoonist (1927–2004)

- Sprague in middle age
- Born: Kenneth Reginald Sprague; 1 January 1927; Bournemouth, Dorset, England
- Died: 25 July 2004 (aged 77); Barnstaple, Devon, England
- Resting place: East Down Parish Churchyard, Devon, England
- Education: Bournemouth Municipal College
- Occupations: Political cartoonist, graphic designer, journalist, activist, TV presenter, psychotherapist
- Years active: c. 1937 – 2004
- Known for: Cartoons; posters; graphic designs; psychodrama
- Spouses: Sheila Kaye (m. 1951-1973); Marcia Karp (m. 1974)
- Children: 7

Ken Sprague (1 January 1927 – 25 July 2004) was an English political cartoonist, graphic designer, journalist, and activist. A socialist, he was involved in trade union, civil rights, and peace movements. In later life, he was also a TV presenter and a psychotherapist. According to his biographer, "In essence the leitmotif of his work is about power and the abuse of power as well as the resilience of ordinary working people to this abuse... It is an art of engagement – engagement for change."

== Early life ==
Ken Sprague was born in Bournemouth on 1 January 1927. His mother made cardboard boxes in a factory, and his father was an engine driver. His first work of art, created in 1937 in response to the bombing of Guernica during the Spanish Civil War, was a linocut printed on his mother's mangle.

Sprague was educated at Alma Road Elementary School and Porchester Road Secondary Modern School, where the headmaster, noticing his talent, recommended that he apply to the local art school. He won a scholarship to Bournemouth Municipal College, attending from the age of 13½. To pay for the cost of materials, his mother took on a cleaning job. At the time, scholarship students tended to be placed in courses for commercial art rather than fine arts, as Sprague recounts:

I was already labelled as the working class kid who'd have to make a living later, so was placed in the commercial class to study design and printing. I wasn't admitted to the fine art classes until I muscled my own way to the life classes.

In 1944, aged 17, he volunteered for the Royal Marines and, the same day, joined the Communist Party of Great Britain. This was not a contradiction, as he later told his biographer:

The Marines had the reputation of killing more Nazis than anyone else and the Communists were seen as the only real force opposing the Nazis.

After basic military training, Sprague was assigned to Vickers Supermarine as a technical artist, and worked on ejector seats for Spitfires. He was also sent to Yugoslavia to bring back an ejector seat from a shot-down German plane.

Postwar, and after a summer stint in a circus, he completed his college diploma course in design and illustration. The Communist Party, he told his biographer, was his "university", remarking that after Bournemouth's newspaper had labelled him as a college revolutionary, local job prospects dwindled. (Note: At the conclusion of an exchange of letters to the editor of the Bournemouth Daily Echo about the Malayan Emergency, published in July/August 1950, the manager of a rubber plantation referred to Sprague's views as "... appear[ing] to have been culled from the pages of the 'Daily Worker'.") He briefly worked for a volunteer labour battalion in Yugoslavia, (Note: For Sprague's account of this experience, see: Sprague, Ken (1991). "A train to Jericho". Journal of the British Psychodrama Association. 6 (1): 19–23. ISSN 0958-9074.) was commissioned by The Scouter to make drawings of a scouts convention, and illustrated a book for the Boy Scouts Association.

Sprague married Sheila Kaye in Bournemouth on 17 March 1951.

== Cartoonist, designer, journalist, activist ==
From 1950 to 1954, Sprague worked in a Carlisle mining company's design office; he also produced cartoons for local newspapers, and was a member of staff of the Tullie House school of art, giving lectures to the local art society. He then moved to London as the Daily Worker's publicity manager, contributing, in addition, as a journalist and cartoonist. He joined the Communist Party Artists Group led by Clifford Rowe.

In 1959, together with Ray Bernard, a socialist businessman, Sprague set up a design company, Mountain and Molehill, to serve the Labour movement, while continuing to produce cartoons for the Daily Worker and its successor, the Morning Star. Sprague set out to persuade trade union leaders that they should harness publicity to win hearts and minds and promote their members' causes. Mountain and Molehill was responsible for several trade union publicity campaigns in the 1960s and 1970s, using techniques – such as leafleting London Tube stations and producing 7-inch vinyl records featuring Ewan MacColl (Note: Come on Gal and Join the Union (1960) for the Garment Workers' Union.) and Acker Bilk (Note: Marching Union (1961) for the National Union of Boot and Shoe Operatives.) – that were innovative for the time. In 1961, the Foundry Workers' Union commissioned the company to design a poster, certificate and gold medal to welcome Yuri Gagarin, the Soviet cosmonaut, to Manchester as an honorary member of the union (he had trained as a foundry worker) during his visit to Britain that year.

In the early 1960s, Sprague was involved in raising funds from unions to support Centre 42, a cultural hub (established by Arnold Wesker and others) in London's Roundhouse. In 1962, he stood as the Communist candidate for the Sydenham East ward in elections to Lewisham London Borough Council. He received 182 votes, and was not elected.

During the 1950s and 1960s, Sprague designed several settings for the Unity Theatre's productions of The Apple Cart, The Cherry Orchard, and The Crucible, among others. In the 1970s, he designed book covers for The Journeyman Press, an independent London- and West Nyack-based publisher.

In the late 1960s, Sprague began editing The Record, the official publication of the Transport and General Workers' Union, illustrating it with his own cartoons. In the words of Jack Jones, the union's general secretary, "His imaginative approach and drive transformed it from a humdrum 'house' journal into a lively, dynamic newspaper." For a short period in 1976, he edited the anti-fascist magazine Searchlight. In the 1980s, his cartoons appeared in Anti-Apartheid News. (Note: ISSN 0003-5580)

== Poster and print-maker ==
Sprague designed posters for, among others, the Anti-Apartheid Movement, the Greenham Common Women's Peace Camp, and the Martin Luther King Memorial Fund. In the late 1950s, he created posters protesting against pit closures in Wales, and a series of anti-racist linocuts, (Note: The series included Contempt, Service, and Happiness.) London Black and White. In 1969, he made We Choose To Work At Porton, a set of posters depicting the attitudes of people working at Porton Down, a British government chemical and biological warfare research facility. (Note: The series comprised It's For Purely Defensive Purposes, It's A Big Dollar Earner, If I Didn't Do It Someone Else Would, We're Only Obeying Government Orders, But The Money Is So Good, and We Choose To Work At Porton.) A 1971 poster opposed the British Industrial Relations Act. Sprague's work for the Martin Luther King Memorial Fund won him an award from the UK's Council of Industrial Design in its 1969 poster competition. His design, incorporating a stylised hand obstructing a bayonet, was called "poignant, well drawn and well designed" by the judges.

Many of his works concerned wars and conflicts, including the Vietnam War, the Warsaw Pact invasion of Czechoslovakia, the Kosovo War, and the Iran–Iraq War. He was a war artist during the latter, accompanying an Iraqi regiment during an attack on Abadan. Sprague met Saddam Hussein and sketched him. He responded to criticism of this encounter and his involvement with Iraq by maintaining that he was documenting the horrors of war, the subject which had brought him to create political art in the first place.

== Film and TV ==
Sprague produced linocuts for Fighting The Bill (1970), an agit-prop film made as part of a campaign against the Industrial Relations Act by the left-wing collective Cinema Action. He was the subject of a 1970 documentary produced by John Green (his future biographer) and Gina Kalla in collaboration with the collective.

In 1976, Poster Man, a documentary about Sprague, was broadcast by the BBC as part of its Omnibus series. Directed by Jeff Perks and introduced by Humphrey Burton, it was repeated in 1977. In 1984, Sprague presented a five-part documentary series, Everyone A Special Kind of Artist, on Channel 4. In each half-hour episode, (Note: A one-hour programme about Arnold Taylor, a seaside postcard designer and illustrator, was broadcast on 24 December 1983 as a prelude to the series.) he interviewed an artist or group of artists and talked about their life and work.

== Psychodramatist ==
In 1971, Sprague moved with his wife Sheila, a potter, to Holwell, a farmhouse near Barnstaple, and converted it into an arts centre. Sheila died in 1973.

With his second wife, Marcia Karp, he then set up the Holwell International Centre for Psychodrama and Sociodrama, which the couple ran until 1998. During this period, Sprague wrote about his experiences as a psychodramatist helping young people with learning difficulties; explained, using short vignettes, the core principles of psychodrama; and contributed a chapter to a handbook on the subject: he illustrated all three works. He also described his attendance at an international conference on psychodrama and group analytic psychotherapy in Buenos Aires in 1985, where he and Karp ran a workshop on the 1982 Falklands War.

In 1998, Sprague and Karp moved to Lynton and set up the Hoewell International Psychodrama Centre.

== Death ==
Ken Sprague died in Barnstaple on 25 July 2004.

== Exhibitions ==
- "Ken Sprague: Paintings, Drawings and Lithographs", (Note: The Hants & Dorset District of the Communist Party organised this two-day exhibition. The article reproduces a drawing by Sprague illustrating the lines "'Tis to work and have such pay / As just keeps life from day to day" in Shelley's The Masque of Anarchy.) December 1950, Southampton
- "Peterloo: Prints to Commemorate the 150th Anniversary", August 1969, Peterloo Gallery, Manchester
- "Printer and Potter at the Peterloo: Ken and Sheila Sprague", January 1971, Peterloo Gallery, Manchester
- "Artists (Note: Besides Sprague, the artists exhibiting included the Ashington Group, Mary Louise Coulouris, Gertrude Elias, Bernard Charnley, Anthony Dorrell, Maureen Scott, and Josef Herman.) in Tribute to the Miners' Struggle and for Trade Union Solidarity", April–May 1974, Congress House, London
- "Ken Sprague: An Exhibition of Posters, Prints, Sculpture", December 1977 – January 1978, Foyles Art Gallery, London
- "Ken Sprague: Prints and Drawings", September–October 1981, Iraqi Cultural Centre, London
- "Ken Sprague: Recent Works", April–May 1982, Newlyn Art Gallery
- "A World to Win: Posters of Protest and Revolution, (Note: This touring exhibition included examples of Sprague's posters alongside work by artists including, from Britain, Peter Kennard, David King, and David Gentleman.) May–November 2014, V&A, National Print Museum (2015), William Morris Gallery (2016), and others

== See also ==
- Anti-fascism – Opposition to fascism
- Labour movement – Economic and political movement seeking to advance workers
- Political cartoon – Illustration used to comment on current events and personalities
- Social history of post-war Britain (1945–1979)
- Socialist realism – Soviet style of realistic art depicting communist values
- Visual art of the United Kingdom in the 20th century
