= Ann Davies (translator) =

British actress and translator (1914–1954)

- Ann Lindsay
- Born: Ann Lorraine Davies; 2 October 1914; Cardiff, Wales
- Died: 9 January 1954 (aged 39); Castle Hedingham, Essex, England
- Education: University College, Cardiff
- Occupations: Actor, translator
- Partner: Jack Lindsay (from 1943)

Ann Lorraine Davies (2 October 1914 – 9 January 1954), also known as Ann Lindsay, was a British actress and translator. She translated Émile Zola's controversial novel La Terre (1887; The Earth) in the 1950s.

== Life ==
Davies was born in Cardiff, Wales, in 1914 to Sarah Ann and Morgan Davies, as one of three children. She went to school locally, before going on to University College, Cardiff in 1932. There she was vice-president of the Students Union and toured America in the 1936 Welsh Hockey team. Her degree was in French.

She became a clerk at Harrods whilst appearing as Robin Hood (the Principal Boy) in the Unity Theatre's political version of Babes in the Wood, which lampooned Neville Chamberlain's appeasement policy and had Davies in a Russian uniform. The production ran for seven months and Montagu Slater credited the play with making political change.

She volunteered to help Basque children and the League of Nations. Davies also had strong links to the communists, and one person described her as the party's "almost pin-up". She went to work for Randall Swingler, who was in partnership with Jack Lindsay; she had an affair with Swingler who was in an open marriage.

In 1940, she was involved with organising the People's Convention that was proposed by the Communist Party of Great Britain, on the arts and entertainment committee. The convention took place in Manchester in February 1941.

She was named as secretary of Newport Communications, a company formed by Swingler to manipulate paper rations. Davies rose to lead the company. In October 1942, she also became the first woman to be president of the Unity Theatre.

In 1943 she settled down with Lindsay; she took the name Ann Lindsay, but they never married. Her partner already had a wife he had left in Australia in 1926. After the war, they both toured Russia and nearby countries together. They moved from London to Castle Hedingham in Essex in 1951, and she underwent surgery for breast cancer.

From 1952 to 1953, she worked on her translation of Émile Zola's novel La Terre (1887; The Earth), which she completed on her deathbed. Having undergone further surgery to remove her ovaries following a re-occurrence of cancer, she died at their home in Castle Hedingham on 9 January 1954, aged 39.
