= Unity Theatre, London =

Theatre club (1936–1994) in London, England

Unity Theatre
- Poster c. 1937
- Formation: 1936; 90 years ago
- Founded at: London, England
- Defunct: 1994
- Type: Amateur theatre club
- Legal status: Cooperative society
- Professional title: Unity Theatre Society Ltd.
- Origins: Workers' Theatre Movement
- Products: Political dramas; documentary dramas; Living Newspapers; satirical pantomimes, musicals and revues; music hall; British premieres of foreign plays
- Main organ: Management committee
- Publication: New Theatre

Unity Theatre was a left-wing amateur theatre club based in several venues in London between 1936 and 1994. It was linked to the Communist Party and allied with the Left Book Club Theatre Guild. Over the years, Unity became affiliated with left-leaning theatres in other parts of London and in Aberdeen, Edinburgh, Glasgow, Cardiff, Liverpool, Leeds, Manchester, Birmingham, Bristol, Oxford, and elsewhere.

During its lifetime, Unity mounted over 250 productions, most of which were new plays, and toured extensively. Its stylistic repertoire was wide, spanning pantomimes, musicals, mass declamations, (Note: In mass declamation, a group of actors (the mass) performs choral speech, chanting and song accompanied by choreographed movements. For a first-hand account of the impact of this technique on audiences of the time, highlighting Unity's production of On Guard for Spain!, see: Beste, R. Vernon (May 1943). "On Mass Declamations". Our Time. 2 (11): 5–6, 29–30 – via Internet Archive.) revues, music hall, sketches, Living Newspapers, agitprop, and conventional three-act plays.

Initially operating from a hall in Britannia Street in Somers Town, Unity moved in 1937 to a converted former chapel in Goldington Street in the same area. After the theatre was destroyed by fire in 1975, productions continued sporadically in other venues until 1994. The original site was sold for social housing, becoming Unity Mews: a plaque commemorates the former theatre.

== History ==
=== Origin and aim ===
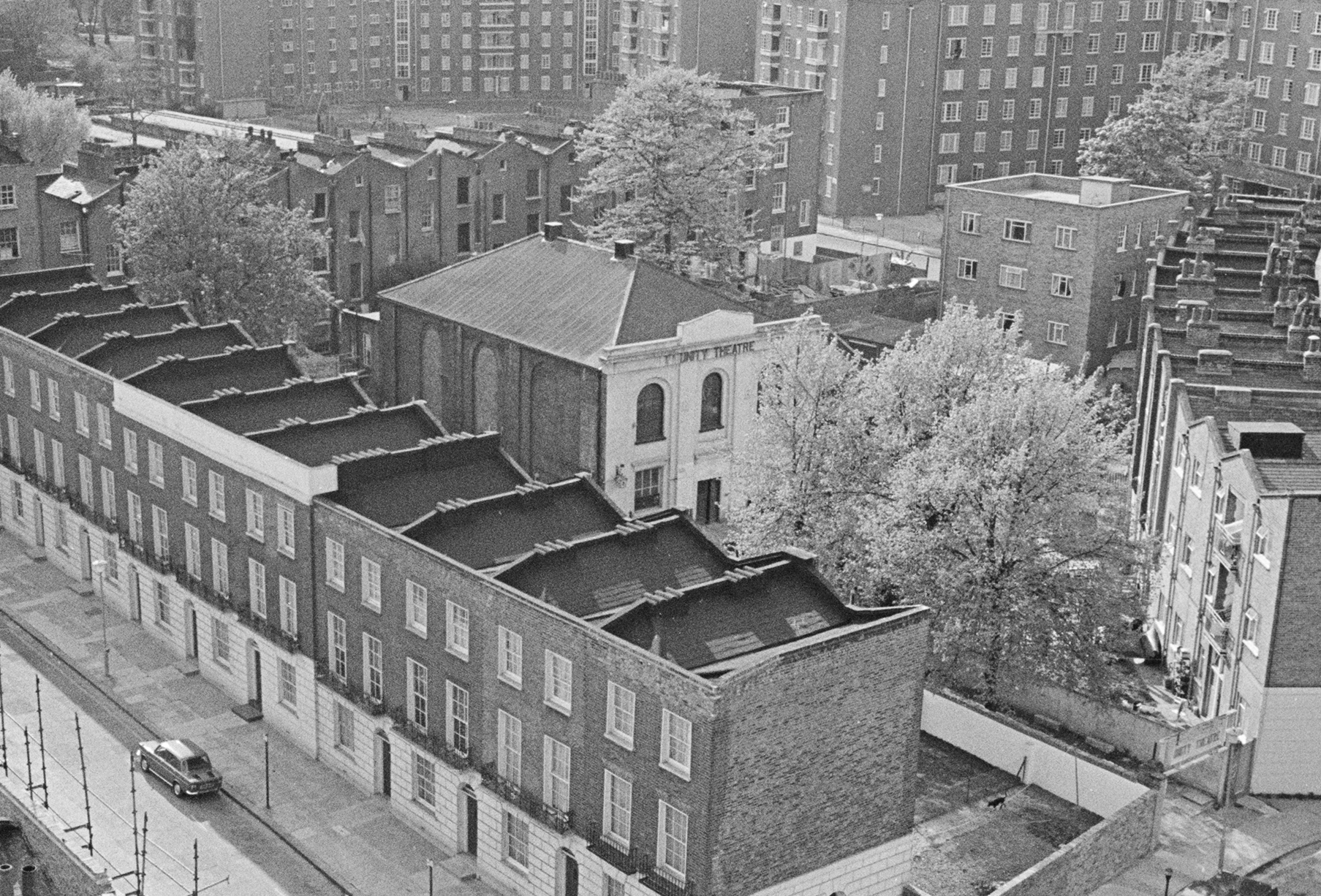
Aerial view of Unity Theatre in Goldington Street, Somers Town, London, in 1974, with alley entrance at bottom right

Unity Theatre emerged from the coming together in the 1930s of the Workers' Theatre Movement (Note: The Workers' Theatre Movement in Britain was established in 1926.) with Left Theatre, (Note: Left Theatre was founded in 1933 by a group involving André van Gyseghem, Barbara Nixon, and Montagu Slater. Wound up in 1937, it was associated with the radical journal Left Review.) Group Theatre, (Note: Group Theatre, established in 1932, performed poetic dramas written for the troupe by T. S. Eliot, W. H. Auden, and Christopher Isherwood (including Auden and Isherwood's The Ascent of F6). Group Theatre drew inspiration from popular theatrical forms such as variety shows and pantomime.) and other London-based workers' theatre groups. (Note: For a detailed account of the emergence of Unity Theatre from the Workers' Theatre Movement, see: Saville, Ian (1990). "Chapter Six: 1933–1935. The End of the Workers' Theatre Movement" (PDF). Ideas, forms and development in the British workers' theatre, 1925–1935 (PDF) (PhD thesis). London: City University. pp. 208–225.) It attempted to create "a single focus for socialist drama", proclaiming that:

Its aim is to help in the vitally urgent struggle for world peace, and a better social and economic order, by establishing a drama which deals with realities, and reflects contemporary life, instead of plays which merely provide a dream world of escape, and at best depict false ideas of life.

After moving to Goldington Street in 1937, Unity Theatre registered as a cooperative society, Unity Theatre Society Ltd., and set up the Unity Theatre Club. The club organised a multitude of cultural and social activities including folk, film, and poetry clubs, a choir, an orchestra, rambles, and parties and dances. The society established a school of dramatic studies, and in 1939 launched a glossy magazine, New Theatre.

=== First decade ===
In its early productions, Unity used several then-novel dramatic forms – satirical pantomime, Living Newspaper, and mass declamation – and brought an international perspective to the London stage with plays by American, Irish, continental European and Russian dramatists.

==== Satirical pantomimes ====
In 1938, Unity's political version of Babes in the Wood, a traditional English children's tale and pantomime, lampooned Neville Chamberlain's appeasement policy during the Munich Crisis. Its cast included Bill Owen, Mark Cheney, Vida Hope, Alfie Bass, and Una Brandon-Jones. Ann Davies (the principal boy) portrayed the Popular Front as Robin Hood, appearing in the uniform of a Soviet soldier at the end of the show to declare:

When strife disturbs and wars corrupt our age
Keen satire is the business of the stage.
When the curtain falls upon our pantomime tonight
Join with the workers in the social fight.

The programme included lyrics for some of the production's songs. Babes in the Wood ran for seven months, and the critic Montagu Slater said the play "had more direct effect on current politics than any other single production in the history of the English stage".

==== Living Newspapers ====
Written and staged in early 1938, Living Newspaper No.1: Busmen, the first British Living Newspaper, dramatised the strike by London busmen in May 1937 for a shorter working day and less onerous schedules.

Busmen who had been strikers were involved in researching material for the play, which incorporated newspaper reports, meeting minutes, transcripts of speeches, statistics, and conversations overheard in bus queues and on buses. A series of short scenes interwove factual material with fictional reconstructions of events, switching between the formal discourse of politicians and trades union officials, extracts from op-eds and editorials, dialogues, statements of facts and figures, and the views of busmen. A "Voice of the Living Newspaper", offstage in the flys above, provided linking commentary. The non-naturalistic style of staging and production drew on the work of German Expressionist playwrights such as Erwin Piscator and Ernst Toller. Alan Bush composed the music, Herbert Hodge wrote scenes between a bus driver and his wife, and Montagu Slater composed the verse. Directed by John Allen, the play ran for three months and attracted generally favourable reviews.

Living Newspaper No.2: Crisis covered the appeasement crisis of September 1938. Put together by the company in 36 hours, it opened on 29 September, the day Chamberlain met Hitler and Mussolini in Munich. The production was updated as events unfolded.

==== Mass declamations ====
Who are the English? was the first of several mass declamations written by Jack Lindsay. Performed in 1936 initially by Unity and then by other left-wing theatre groups, it invoked and celebrated radicals and revolutionaries in British history in an alternative to the traditional imperialist narrative:

I call on those who left the little farms
and left the common lands at Parliament's voice
to chase the grave and comely henpecked king.
I call on Cromwell's Ironsides and the men
who listened to the many voices blown, distracted,
birdcries out of the thicket of blood-darkness ...
Come, you Anabaptists and you Levellers,
come, you Muggletonians, all you Bedlamites,
fall in behind us, you are not English, comrades.

— Jack Lindsay (1936), Who are the English? (extract from sixth verse)

==== Spain ====
Unity was active in the anti-fascist movement supporting the Spanish Republic during Spain's civil war. In 1936, the troupe performed Spain, a poem by Randall Swingler adapted by Edgar Criddle for mass declamation as "A drama of modern history":

spain –
People of England, while you ponder,
The ring is closing, the iron ring that strangles us.
Your government is ready now
To sacrifice its boasted empire
To uphold the privilege of its class.
... Time weighs heavily on us.
The voice of the people crying to the people:
"Today it is us
Tomorrow it will be you".
chorus & peasant –
People of England, what are you going to do?

— Final lines of Spain: A drama of modern history (Unity acting script)

A reworking of Jack Lindsay's poem On Guard for Spain! followed in 1937. Transformed by Unity into a declamatory piece for voices and chorus, there were several versions, with Lindsay writing extra stanzas at Unity's request. On Guard was performed by theatre groups across Britain:

spanish man –
Workers,
drive off the fascist vultures gathering
to pick the bones of Spanish cities,
to leave the Spanish fields
dunged with peasant dead
that greed may reap the fattened crops.
spanish woman –
Fuse your unity in the furnace of our pain.
spanish man –
Enter this compact of steel.
spanish man & spanish woman –
And then we shall not complain.
all women –
On guard for the human future!
all men –
On guard for the people of Spain!

— Final stanza of On Guard for Spain! (Unity acting script) (Note: Breden (2020) reproduces an acting script based on the version used by Bristol Unity Players with amendments drawn from London Unity Theatre archives and versions of Lindsay's original poem.)

==== Wartime ====
In May 1939, the society recorded 7,000 members, with affiliated organisations (such as trades union branches and cooperative societies) accounting for another 250,000.

On 3 September that year, Britain declared war on Germany at the outbreak of World War II, and all theatres and other places of public entertainment were closed. Unity Theatre re-opened two weeks later (the first theatre to do so), staging a revue, Sandbag Follies, and then another, Turn Up the Lights. Both criticised government policy, with Unity declaring in a pamphlet that "We are the first theatre to attack the war policy of a government in wartime since Euripedes' Trojan Women was performed in Athens in 415 BC."

Many of the troupe's actors and writers were conscripted, and the theatre was bombed several times. Unity remained active throughout the conflict: besides staging plays, pantomimes and revues, from September 1940, at the start of The Blitz, its Outside Show (later Mobile) Group presented plays and sketches in factories, hospitals, parks, and air-raid shelters, putting on over 1,000 performances. Ann Davies described performing in a shelter in Belsize Park tube station:

Swanee River, John Brown's Body, Roll out the Barrel, etc., got them interested ... prepared the way for a couple of sketches, solos, songs and jokes. Ten minutes at one end of the platform, and ten the other ... and finally a show at each end of the liftshafts. Even when these items had to be done sideways-on ... they went over big, and the crowd was almost as pleased as we were. (Note: During the war, Ann Davies became the theatre's first woman president.)

In addition, Unity members were involved with the Army Bureau of Current Affairs, whose small Play Unit, set up in 1943, included several prominent members of the troupe, such as Jack Lindsay, Ted Willis, Mulk Raj Anand, and André van Gyseghem. The Play Unit toured military bases in Britain and abroad.

==== Critical reception ====
The chief theatre critic of The Sunday Times, writing in 1990, said:

The best work of the Unity Theater was done in the 1930s and during World War II. At a time of great poverty and ideological confusion, it provided a political and artistic outlet for people who were getting tired of being patronized and who were increasingly suspicious of their politicians.

=== Postwar ===
==== Professional company ====
Shortly after the end of the war, Unity declared its intention to set up a professional repertory company:

We have left behind the rather narrow propaganda play ... The people have developed a breadth of interest and confidence which demands a new expression ... [and they] demand technical competence. Therefore the amateur theatre must raise its standards. ... Therefore, Unity Theatre aims at creating a professional theatre alongside its amateur companies.

The professional company launched in early 1946 under the direction of Ted Willis with a production of Eugene O'Neill's All God's Chillun Got Wings. In May 1947, for economic reasons, the venture collapsed: several productions had been flops, no subsidy from the newly founded Arts Council was forthcoming, and with the advent of the Cold War, Unity's popularity suffered from its association with the Communist Party.

==== Role ====
During the war's aftermath, the satirical and documentary approaches taken in Unity Theatre productions became mainstream both in professional theatres in London and popular television programmes. According to Chambers (1989), "Unity turned inwards and failed either to find a new role or to renew with sufficient vigour its traditional one." The London theatre closed after a fire in 1975. In the view of Peter (1990), "[Unity Theatre] finally expired ... because it represented a spirit of old-fashioned opposition and could not find its place in a more strident and increasingly prosperous age."

Attempts were made to revive the theatre in the late 1980s and early 1990s with a studio theatre in the space now occupied by Camden People's Theatre. The Merseyside Left Theatre, which became an affiliate of Unity Theatre in 1939, has, since 1944, operated first as Merseyside Unity Theatre and then as Unity Theatre Liverpool. Unity Theatre Cardiff, formed in 1942, left the Unity Theatre movement in 1948 and was renamed Everyman Theatre Cardiff.

The Unity Theatre Trust was established in 1962 as a registered charity with the aim of "[advancing] the education of the public by fostering, promoting and increasing the interest of the public in the art of drama and the co-related arts." It maintains an archive and awards grants.

=== Archives ===
Several archives have collections of material related to Unity Theatre. The Unity Theatre Trust's archive is housed at a branch of the Victoria and Albert Museum in London. Salford's Working Class Movement Library also has a collection, as does the People's History Museum in Manchester. The Bishopsgate Institute in London hosts two collections: one accumulated by Harry Landis, and the other by Ron Travis, who undertook research towards a PhD in the history of Unity Theatre. The Herbert P. J. Marshall collection is held by Southern Illinois University.

In 1978, BBC Radio 3 broadcast a one-hour programme on the history of Unity Theatre. It featured the recorded voices of Bill Owen, André van Gyseghem, Declan Mulholland, Maxine Audley, Ted Willis, and others; readers included Eric Allan, Gavin Campbell, Anthony Newlands, and Terry Scully. The programme also featured several commercial recordings of songs from Unity revues.

== Notable people ==
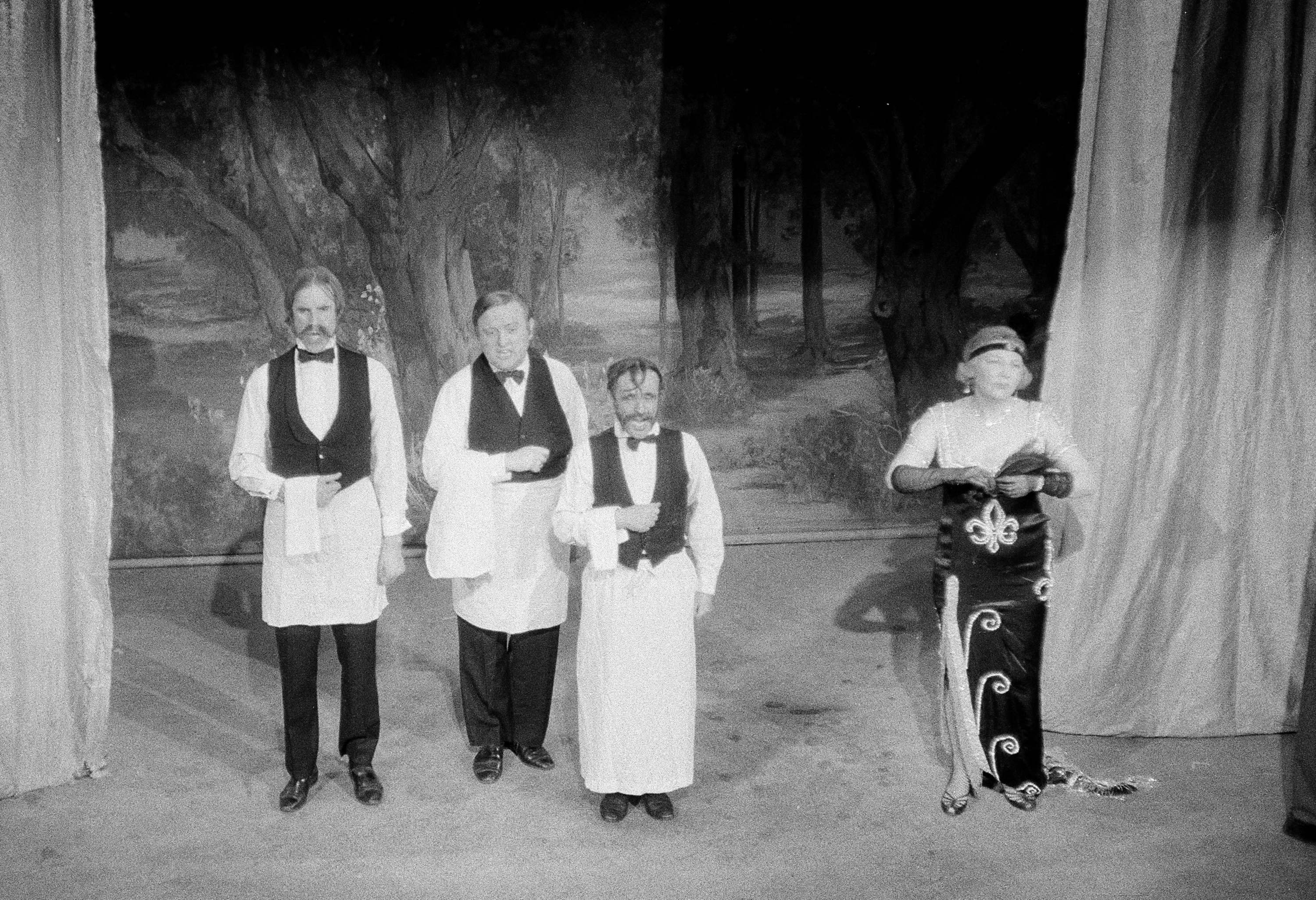
Music hall performance, c. 1973, with actor-manager Raymond Cross second from left

=== Dramatists ===
Unity introduced several international dramatists to the British stage, presenting premieres of Odets' Waiting for Lefty (1936), Brecht's Señora Carrar's Rifles (1938), O'Casey's The Star Turns Red (1940), Sartre's Nekrassov (1956), and Adamov's Spring '71 (1962). The theatre also helped popularise the plays of Gorky.

=== Actors ===
Notable actors associated with Unity Theatre included Alfie Bass, Una Brandon-Jones, Michael Gambon, Julian Glover, Vida Hope, Bob Hoskins, David Kossoff, Harry Landis, Herbert Lom, Warren Mitchell, Bill Owen, Eric Paice, Michael Redgrave, Paul Robeson, actor-manager Hazel Vincent Wallace, Ted Willis, and Roger Woddis.

=== Musicians ===
Notable musicians associated with the theatre included composers Alan Bush and Christian Darnton, conductor David Ellenberg, pianist James Gibb, baritone John Goss, piano duo Mary and Geraldine Peppin, composer John Sykes, and composer and songwriter Lionel Bart. Bart's earliest contributions were lyrics for Turn It Up, a revue. He also wrote the lyrics for an agitprop version of Cinderella and the revue Peacemeal, and composed the musical Wally Pone, based on Ben Jonson's Volpone.

=== Designers ===
The designers of Unity Theatre's sets, costumes, and programmes included James Friell and Lawrence Gowing (sets for Babes in the Wood); James Boswell, who designed the programme for Giant Ripper (1940); and John Heartfield, who contributed to the translation and design of the Soviet thriller Comrade Detective (1944). Rivka Black and Ern Brooks created sets and costumes for various productions. During the 1950s and 1960s, Ken Sprague designed several sets for productions of Shaw's The Apple Cart, Chekov's The Cherry Orchard, and Miller's The Crucible. Sean Kenny designed the sets and lighting for Bloomsday (1960), an adaptation of Joyce's novel Ulysses.

=== Managers ===
Managers, at various times, of the theatre or its sectional activities included Heinz Bernard (director), Alec Bernstein (chair), Raymond Cross (business manager), Jack Firestein (who ran Unity's folk club and bookstall), Oscar Lewenstein (general manager, and secretary of the national society), and André van Gyseghem (president).

== Productions ==
Chambers (1989) chronicles productions in Unity's two principal theatres: Britannia Street, covering 1936 and 1937, and Goldington Street, from 1937 to 1975 (when the theatre burnt down). He also lists performances that took place in various venues from 1976 to 1983 (Note: Chambers stops in 1983 because, in his view, "arguments intensified over who could legitimately represent Unity to such an extent that further additions would have been meaningless".) and touring productions. The Unity Theatre Trust lists productions from 1936 to 1994.

=== Selected productions ===
==== 1936–1939 ====
- Waiting for Lefty (1936)
- Where's That Bomb? (1936)
- Bury the Dead (1938)
- Busmen (1938)
- Plant in the Sun (1938)
- Señora Carrar's Rifles (1938)
- Babes in the Wood (1938)
- Sandbag Follies (1939)

==== 1940s ====
- The Star Turns Red (1940)
- The Match Girls (1940)
- Jack the Giant-Killer (1940)
- Till the Day I Die (1941)
- Sabotage! (1942)
- One-Third of a Nation (1943)
- Comrade Detective (1944)
- Alice in Thunderland (1945)
- All God's Chillun Got Wings (1946)
- Enemies (1947)
- The Russian Question (1947)
- What's Left? (1948)
- The Ragged-Trousered Philanthropists (1949)

==== 1950s ====
- Longitude 49 (1950)
- The Cradle Will Rock (1951)
- The Wages of Eve (1952)
- The Rosenbergs (1953)
- Reedy River (1954)
- The Pillars of Society (1955)
- Nekrassov (1956)
- World on Edge (1956)
- Cyanamide (1957)
- Wally Pone (1958)
- Anna Christie (1959)

==== 1960s ====
- Bloomsday (1960)
- The Visions of Simone Machard (1961)
- Spring '71 (1962)
- The Fury of Philip Hotz (1963)
- The Good Woman of Setzuan (1964)
- There's a Megabutton on My Living-room Floor (1965)
- Death of a Salesman (1966)
- Antigone (1967)
- Harold Muggins is a Martyr (1968)
- The Frogs and Co ... Axed! (1969)

==== 1970s ====
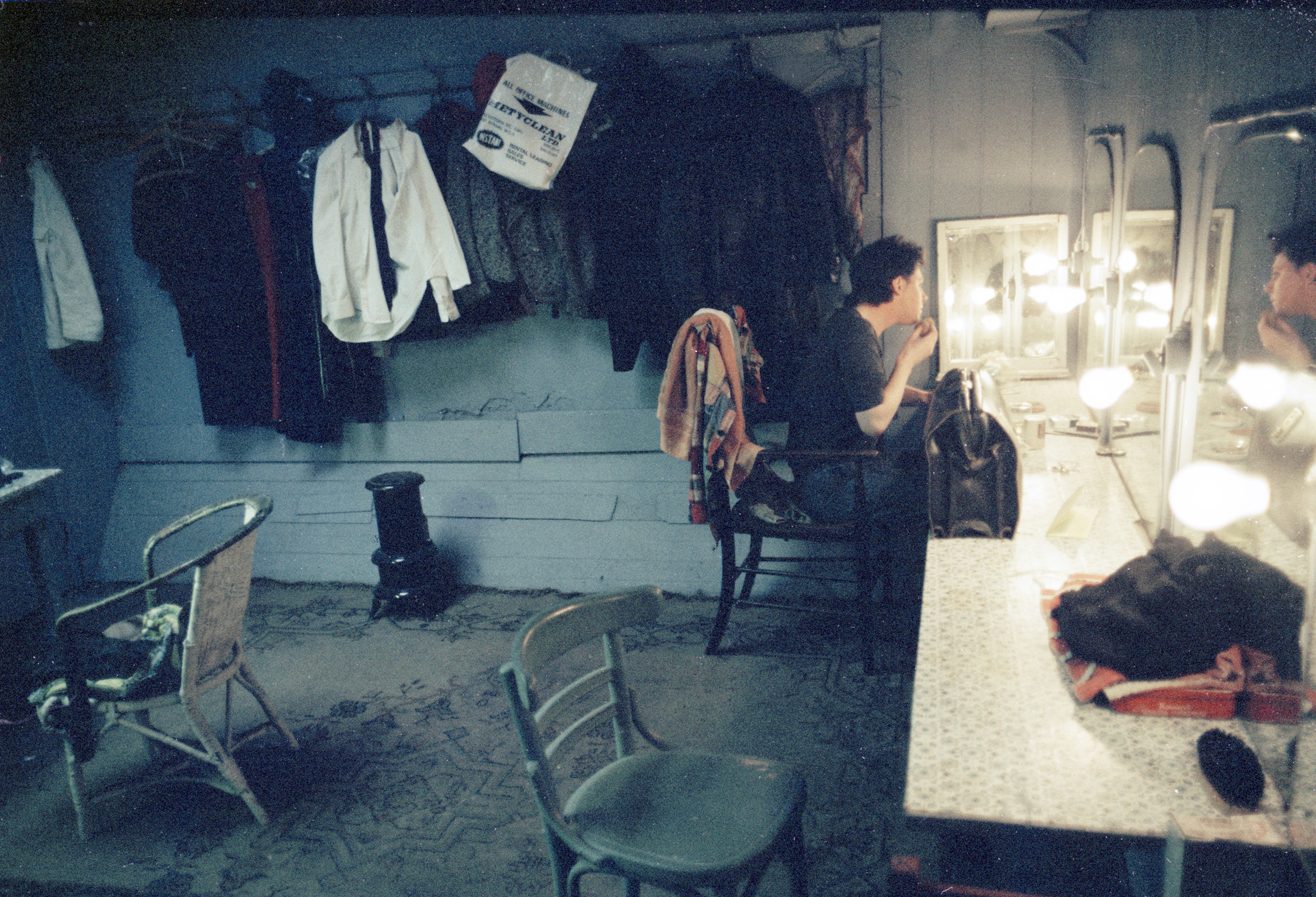
Changing room, 1974

- South Africa '70 (1970)
- They Made a Present of Mornington Crescent (1971)
- In Place of Strife (1971)
- Rent, or Caught in the Act (1972)
- Tom Barker of Camden and the World (1973)
- Vietnam – The "Post-War" War (1974)
- The Nuns (1975)
- God is Just a Copper in a Long White Beard (1977)
- God Bless the Guv'nor (1979)

== See also ==
- Documentary theatre – Theatre based on presenting factual material
- English drama – 1901–1945 and 1945–2000
- Interwar Britain – British history, 1918–1939
- Music hall – Type of British theatrical entertainment popular between 1850 and 1960
- Political theatre – Drama with a political component
- Social history of post-war Britain (1945–1979)
