= Nekrassov =

Play by Jean-Paul Sartre

Nekrassov, or the Farce in Eight Scenes is a satirical drama written by Jean-Paul Sartre in 1955.

== Plot ==
Nekrassov takes place in the 1950s Paris. It shows the life of the unfortunate journalist Sibilot who works at the right-wing newspaper of France, Soir á Paris. His work is mostly to write anti-communist propaganda. The main turnpoint in his life when he cannot come up with any great idea, and his boss, Jules Palotin, tells him that if he does not find any news he will fire him. However, during his depression the luck comes to his house in the person of Georges De Valera, an internationally wanted swindler. De Valera's main talent is to use his words to manipulate almost everyone around him to his own benefit. De Valera told Sibilot, he has a story which can save the journalist's career but only if Sibilot rejects to give him to the police. After that we can spectate the way of Georges De Valera becoming Nikita Nekrassov - an escaped soviet minister - and how he made his life to the level of the national hero of France.

== Scenes ==
=== Scene 1 ===
The opening scene is the dialogue of a homeless man and his wife about a man on the bridge ready to jump into the river. There is an argument between them whether help the man or let him die; whether they should take the man's jacket or not. Finally they decide to help the man, against his will. After some really morally difficult dialogues, the police arrived looking for Georges De Valera, swindler and wanted criminal. Georges pretends to be sleeping but suddenly he made his way away and escaped the officers. The homeless people jumped into the River Seine.

=== Scene 2 ===
The setting is the office of Jules Palotin. The secretary and Palotin having a discussion about photographs, the administrative committee and President Mouton. Sibiliot entering the scene with his shy and perplexed behaviour. He draws up his unfortunate situation, that he only gets 70000 monthly, and his wife is ill and is in a hospital. Palotin refuses to increase his salary unless Sibilot comes up with a brand new idea about the Communists' terror or the wrongs of Soviet Union. When Sibilot left, Tavernier and Périgord enters the office. They are talking about the headline of the paper. Both employees have no great ideas to come up with, which makes Palotin frustrated.

"Good news" appeared: Nekrassov, Soviet Interior Minister, defected from the Soviet Union and in the same time, Georges De Valera, the greatest criminal mind of their age, escaped. Both can be great stories, thought Palotin.

Later Mouton appeared and provoked Palotin to write a better article, a bigger news against the communists, reminding the editor the old great quality of the paper. Finally Sibilot accepted to write the article, and went home.

=== Scene 3 ===
Georges De Valera - chased by the police officers - jumps into Sibilot's house, and meets Veronica. Georges thought he will be recognized as a thief by the girl and the girl would scream and panic, but it happened differently. Veronica behaved very calm even if she suspected that a criminal was standing in front of her. After the initial shock, they started to talk. From their dialogue the reader can gather some information about Georges, for instance, he is a great actor and that he does not trust women. They get to know each other a bit, and it results that Veronica sends off the police officers who finally got to her home.

Meanwhile, Sibilot arrives home and Georges hides in the bedroom. Veronika and her father discusses the day, the unfortunate twist in the man's career and that he needs some idea. Veronica tells Sibilot that there is an unknown man in their home, but she thinks that the arrest of the man is unnecessary.

When Veronica left for work, Sibilot started thinking, however, Georges' sneezing interrupted him too many times and he got angry. Sibilot wanted to call the police, but Georges - as usual - talked about an idea which he will only reveal at the editor's office, but it is perfect and it can save Sibilot.

=== Scene 4 ===
The setting is the office again. Palotin and the journalists are brainstorming about the headline and about the next really great article that they should create. Sibilot is late, the boss is angry and he now wants to fire Sibilot.

Sibilot finally arrived accompanied with Georges. First, they wanted to imitate that Georges couldn't speak their language but after the meaningless argument Georges have been introduced as Nekrassov. After that moment, Sibilot became the hero of the day as he brought the sensation of the day. Doing the habitual routine Georges successfully manipulated Palotin to believe he is Nikita Nekrassov. Then they started to talk about the great and secret information which Nekrassov might has. The Administration Committee were invited into the office, and Nekrassov started to point out - of course, randomly - the members who are "on the list of people who will be executed". Almost every member "will be shot" except the president, Mouton.

Hearing this, Mouton lost his sanity because of the wound on his pride, and swore that he will destroy the newspaper, Palotin and Nekrassov as well. Then when Mouton disappeared, and they tried to figure out the future of the committee, Georges started to tell his claims. He needs guards, a place to live, some money and to increase Sibilot's salary from 70,000 to 210,000.

=== Scene 5 ===
The scene starts at the hotel room of Georges. He received a bouquet of roses and he told the two guards that it is dangerous and poisonous: and the poison is hatred. The guard did not really understand.

Then Sibilot enters the room, while Georges is talking to himself in the mirror. The dialogue between the two might imply that Georges started to forget his real identity to become Nekrassov. After some deep talk and some round of practice, Sibilot also acts as Georges is Nikita Nekrassov.

Later on Veronica visits Georges. They are having a conversation full of suspicious elements of both sides which made the whole situation absurd: they do not trust each other but in the same time they like each other. Veronica makes Georges frustrated and angry: she thinks Georges only a mean person who use everybody to his own benefit and then leaves his victims. This is not true, thinks Georges, he is just taking part in the political field. At the end of the scene Georges is getting ready for the party at Bounouminé and destroying his room because of his rage.

=== Scene 6 ===
Everyone is present at the party and they are celebrating Perdriére. Everything seemed peaceful until Baudouin and Chapuis - the supervisors of the defensive division - announced that there is a probability of assassination or any kind of terrorism. The atmosphere started to be heated when Mouton suddenly appeared with Demidoff on his side. He brought the Russian, to reveal the true identity of Nekrassov. When Mouton saw Nekrassov he and Demidoff started their plan. However, Georges planned quickly and asked the guards to make everyone leave the room because he wanted to talk with Demidoff in private. It succeeded and he could manipulate Demidoff to accept his identity as Nekrassov. When their conversation ended, everyone returned and Mouton asked whether that man is Nekrassov or not. Demidoff said, yes. Mouton rushed towards Nekrassov and attempted to assassinate him with a revolver but Bounouminé and Chapuis stopped Mouton and disarmed him. The guards came in and took Mouton out. Near the end of the scene it turns out that Baudouin and Chapuis know the truth about Georges and they want to make him testify against Robert Duval and Charles Maistre. Georges managed to escape with the help of the drunk Demidoff who made enough turmoil to distract everyone so Georges could escape as soon as possible.

=== Scene 7 ===
George returned to Veronica, and now they seems to be really into each other. They are discussing their present situation when suddenly the police and the defensive division arrived with some medics - the DD wanted to make Veronica believe that Georges lost his sanity - to gather Georges and take him to prison or some hidden base. However, Demidoff, who is still under the effect of the beverages, wanted to claim his new colleague as well so he knocked out everyone so Georges and Veronica could escape, and never return.

=== Scene 8 ===
The members of the Administration Committee are suffering the aftereffect of the party at the previous night. Everyone is tired or hangover. The beaten defensive division arrived to make their situation look better: they told everyone that Nekrassov was Georges De Valera, and when they went to get him, a group of communist soldiers were protecting him, that's why they are in this condition. The Committee makes Mouton their president again, they decide to fire Palotin because of his bad decisions, and they choose to make Sibilot the editor in Chief of the Soir á Paris.

== Characters ==
=== Georges De Valera / Nikita Nekrassov ===
Actor: Michel Vitold Georges De Valera is the protagonist of the drama. His story begins on a bridge, ready to fall into the river to commit suicide. Although, he couldn't make his plan because of the homeless couple who saw him. After the police arrived, he escaped hastily and jumped into the home of Sibilot and his daughter, Veronica. After manipulating Sibilot, his life changed: Everyone started to believe his story - he also - that he is the escaped soviet minister, Nekrassov, and that he had some important and top secret information about the Russian and the Communist Party. One of the most important documents - which probably has never existed - is the list of people who will be executed.

=== Sibilot ===
Actor: Jean Parédés A poor middle-aged journalist who writes anti-communist propaganda for a right-wing French newspaper, the Soir á Paris. He lives with his daughter Veronica. His scene starts with his statement to his boss - Jules Palotin - to raise his salary because what he gets a month is simply not enough for living. This request was dismissed. Then Sibilot got into trouble when his future career has been bound to a newsworthy article about the Communists - this is the reason why he accepted the help of the swindler Georges.

=== Jules Palotin ===
Editor in Chief of the Soir á Paris, boss of Sibilot, Tavernier and Périgord. He is very emotional, he is very connected to the newspaper and the editorial staff: his only goal to make his paper great. He is also the "victim" of Georges: he believes that Georges is Nekrassov and he also convinces his employees about this false information. Very kind - except the case of Sibilot when he refused Sibilot's request - but very naive. He has the power over the editorial staff but he is afraid the Administrative Committee and its president, Mouton.

=== Veronica ===
Smart and young daughter of Sibilot. She is also a journalist but she works for a communist party newspaper. She has encountered Georges in the beginning, and showed no fear or obedience towards Georges. She always wants to open up De Valera's eyes to make him see his own selfish and coward personality. At the end they both disappear together.

=== Goblet ===
Actor: R. J. Chauffard Detective whose main purpose to chase Georges De Valera everywhere. However, his success is always interrupted by someone.

=== Tavernier and Périgord ===
Actors: Robert Seller and Clément Harari Employees of Palotin, they are journalists. They both respect and obey Palotin, which makes them simple, naive and underwitted.

=== Mouton ===
Actor: Jean Toulout The president of the Administrative Committee who holds Palotin in his hands. We discover his overflowing pride, when he discovers that he is not on the list of people to be executed. He decides to reveal the true identity of Nekrassov and destroy Palotin's newspaper.

=== Nerciat, Leminier, Charivet, Bergerat ===
Actors: Georges Sellier, Daniel Mendaille, Max Mégy, Lefévre-bel Members of the Administrative Committee, they have the same function in the drama as Tavernier and Périgord but they are loyal to Mouton and not Palotin.

=== First Guard, Second Guard ===
Bodyguards of Nikita Nekrassov (Georges) who protect the impostor from any harm. Later, we get to know that they are spies, who have been making photos of Georges, to reveal the truth and to threaten him.

=== Baudouin and Chapuis ===
Supervisors of the Defensive Division. They get Georges at the end to make him testify against Robert Duval and Charles Maistre.

=== Demidoff ===
Russian minister, escaped from the Soviet Union. He knows the real Nikita Nekrassov, and that's why he almost revealed Georges to Mouton at the party. However, Demidoff is also a brute-like underwitted person. Georges learned that if Demidoff drinks too much alcohol, he becomes a raging beast. Taking advantage of this "defect", Georges manages to escape both the party and the arrest at the end.

== Productions ==
The British premiere took place in London's Unity Theatre in early 1956. The production ran for four months and was acclaimed by critics.

== Philosophy of Sartre ==
In Nekrassov the reader can spectate several issues which exist in the philosophy of Jean-Paul Sartre. The question of identity as Georges fights with himself to decide which identity is the stronger (Nekrassov or Georges) is one of the key elements. However, the issue of power and the structure of the hierarchy also appears in the hierarchy of the Soir á Paris.

The human folly and that we try to manipulate and own other people, and how it affects our moral life also a great deal in the drama, and in the Being and Nothingness as well.
