= Jack Firestein =

British bookseller, socialist and Labour activist

- Born: 1917; Whitechapel
- Died: November 2004; London Borough of Camden
- Occupations: Bookseller, tailor, activist
- Political party: Communist Party of Great Britain, Labour Party, Respect Party
- Awards: Military Medal (1944)

Jack Firestein (1917–2004) was a British socialist and Labour activist.

== Life ==
He was born in Whitechapel, London, to an eastern European Jewish family, he left school when he was 14 to follow his father as a tailor, he later became a bookseller, a profession he continued most of his life. In the early 1930s Firestein joined the Communist Party. In 1936, he was involved in the Battle of Cable Street, when Oswald Mosley's Blackshirts were routed by a mobilisation of East End workers. In the Second World War he joined the Royal Fusiliers who were involved in the Italian campaigns. He was seriously injured when a bullet passed through his body in the battle of Anzio, where he was taken prisoner by the Germans. Jack was subsequently awarded the Military Medal.

After the war he went back to the book trade and in the 1950s he ran the Union Theatre Folk Club in London for more than 16 years, until the theatre was burnt down in 1975. He was a founding member of the London Socialist Film Co-op and also worked as a chauffeur for Clive Jenkins, a British trade union leader, for many years. He left the Communist Party in 1956 after the Soviet Union suppression of the Hungarian Uprising that year.

He joined the Labour Party and remained a member until his death. He ran an open-air book stall outside of the headquarters of Camden Labour Party – although his disillusionment with the party led him to join the then recently formed Respect Party without renouncing his Labour Party membership. He was deeply involved with his local Neighbourhood Advice Centre as a trustee on the management board, and he also dedicated many hours to helping others with welfare problems.

In 2009, Chris Reeves, a London filmmaker of Platform films, made a film remembrance of his life entitled Only a Bookseller. It was accepted into the 2010 Canadian Labour International Film Festival (CLiFF).
