= Montagu Slater =

British writer (1902–1956)

- Born: Charles Montagu Slater; 23 September 1902; Millom, Cumberland, England
- Died: 19 December 1956 (aged 54); London, United Kingdom
- Occupations: Poet, novelist, playwright, librettist
- Writing career
- Genres: Poetry, fiction, theatre, opera

Charles Montagu Slater (23 September 1902 – 19 December 1956) was an English poet, novelist, playwright, journalist, critic and librettist.

== Life ==
One of five children, Slater was born in the small mining port of Millom, Cumberland facing Lancashire across the estuary of Duddon sands. His father Seth Slater, a Wesleyan lay preacher, was a tailor and ran the town's post office. Both Montagu and his closest sister Rosa won scholarships to universities from the local school. He attended Magdalen College, Oxford and University College London.

Slater married Enid Mace (1903-1988) in Lancashire in 1929.

== Career ==
Upon graduation, Slater became a reporter for the Liverpool Post.

At Millom and Liverpool, Slater wrote verse which he valued, often linking northern port-life to classical legend and philosophy. Much survives although little has yet been published. An activist, he joined the Communist Party in 1927, leaving Liverpool to join The Morning Post in London in 1928. In 1934 he gave up most of his journalism to found the Left Review, becoming its editor while publishing literary criticism, plays, poems, short stories, and film scripts, often using the pseudonym 'Ajax'.

Always interested in theatre, Slater wrote introductions to editions of the melodramas about two infamous murder cases, the Red Barn murder of Maria Marten and the excesses of Sweeney Todd, the barber, in 1928 and 1933. In this period he also worked with Benjamin Britten, who composed some incidental music for three of his plays. These included Easter 1916, a play covering the 1913 lock-out and the 1916 Rising, staged by the Unity Theatre, London in 1935. In 1935, he wrote an uncredited script for Coal Face, a short documentary film, and the following year his pamphlet, Stay down, miner, was published.

In 1937, the left-wing Unity Theatre produced a highly successful play "Busmen" based on the strike which chronicled the struggle for speed up and pay cuts to its defeat in 1937, written by Herbert Hodge a London taxi driver and Montagu Slater, with Alan Bush providing the music. It utilised a "living newspaper form" with cinematic cutting, developed with the Federal Theatre project in the USA. Other plays of this period include David and Touch and Go.

Slater was also involved in staging large pageants, including one in 1938 at Wembley Stadium. For this, he wrote a scenario with André van Gyseghem for composer Alan Bush's Pageant of Co-operation. He was one of a group of Communist intellectuals who came together to celebrate the 100th anniversary of the publication of the Communist Manifesto in 1948 with a pageant held at the Royal Albert Hall on 30 March 1948. Music and arrangements by composers including Rutland Boughton, Christian Darnton, Inglis Gundry, Phillip Cardew, Malcolm Arnold, Aubrey Bowman, and Bernard Stevens. Alan Bush arranged music for the Finale comprising 'The Red Flag' and 'The Internationale'. Slater scripted the entire event.

In 1942, Benjamin Britten chose Slater as librettist for his opera Peter Grimes, which was based on "Letter XXII: Peter Grimes" in George Crabbe's poem The Borough. For the libretto, Slater eschewed the traditional five-stress line form of English rhyming or blank verse in favour of a more modern and conversational four-stress line with rhyming couplets. He argued that contemporary listeners were accustomed to assonance and consonantal rhyme, but it could also be argued that this form of 'rough' rhyme was common in early English drama and that Slater was restoring it to the stage, rather than inventing something new.

Slater's original libretto, which he published himself (to the annoyance of Britten and Peter Pears, who had made a number of amendments to it before the opera was staged), is cast in three acts. It omits the repetitions necessary in the actual opera. Anthony Burgess, writing in The Listener in 1964, stated:

"The excellence of Peter Grimes has a great deal to do with Montagu Slater's libretto, the only libretto I know that can be read in its own right as a dramatic poem."

Slater also wrote the libretto for Yerma, composed by Denis ApIvor.

Slater was involved, with Britten and W. H. Auden, in many of the John Grierson documentaries, such as Coal Face (1935). In 1936 he published the account Stay Down, Miner, about a strike at the Nine Mile Point Colliery; Stay Down, Miner was performed as a play by Left Theatre Ltd., with music composed by Britten, in the same year.

In 1944, Slater published the novel Once a Jolly Swagman set in the then-popular world of motorcycle speedway racing, which explored the themes of unionism, workers' compensation, and disaffected youth. Jack Lee subsequently directed a 1949 film adaptation under the same title, with a screenplay by William Rose and starring Dirk Bogarde.

Slater wrote the scripts for several films, including The Brave Don't Cry (1952), about a mining disaster.

Britten dedicated his Temporal Variations for oboe and piano to Slater, and his Ballad of Heroes to Slater and his wife Enid.

Slater died at the age of 54 in London. His literary papers and correspondence are held at the University of Nottingham.

== Published works ==
- Maria Marten & Sweeney Todd: Two Classic Melodramas. London: Gerald Howe, 1928.
- Sweeney Todd, the Demon Barber of Fleet Street ... A traditional acting version, edited, with an introduction (Barnstormer Plays. no. 2.). London: Gerald Howe, 1928.
- The Second City. London: Wishart & Co, 1931.
- Haunting Europe. London: Wishart & Co, 1934.
- Easter : 1916 (a play). London: Lawrence & Wishart, 1936.
- Stay Down Miner. An account of a strike at Nine Mile Point Colliery. London: Martin Lawrence, 1936.
- New Way Wins, a play from Stay Down Miner. London: Lawrence and Wishart, 1937.
- Barnstormer Plays. Edited with an introduction to each play. John Lane, The Bodley Head, 1943.
- Once a Jolly Swagman (a novel). London: John Lane, 1944.
- Peter Grimes and other poems. London: John Lane, 1946
- Peter Grimes: Essays by B. Britten, E.M. Forster, M. Slater, E. Sackville-West. Designs by K. Green (Sadler's Wells Opera Books No. 3). London: John Lane, 1946.
- Century for George (a play). London: John Lane, 1946.
- Who rides a tiger. A novel. London: The Bodley Head, 1947.
- ‘Communist Manifesto Centenary Pageant’, to a script by Montagu Slater, with music for military band and chorus; MSS British Mus. 411–413. Alan Bush Collection. Vols lxxxvi-lxxxviii, 1948.
- The inhabitants. London: Bodley Head, 1948.
- The Centenary Poe. Tales, Poems, Criticism. London: Bodley Head, 1949.
- Theatre Today with Arnold Rattenbury. London: Saturn Press, 1948.
- Englishman With Swords. London: The Bodley Head, 1949.
- Round the world in eighty days: A stage spectacle (Barnstormer plays series-no.5). London: John Lane, 1951.
- Caste: a traditional acting version. London: John Lane, The Bodley Head, 1951.
- Cure of Minds. London: Williams & Norgate, 1952.
- New Poems: a PEN anthology: edited by C. Dyment, R. Fuller, M. Slater. London: Michael Joseph, 1952.
- The Trial of Jomo Kenyatta. London: Secker & Warburg, 1955.
- Yerma, opera (libretto, Montagu Slater, revised by the composer, based on the play by Federico Garcia Lorca), op. 28; 1955–1958. * Four volumes. Pivor Manuscripts (Series II). Vols. VII-X. British MS 64826-64829 : 1955–1958.
