= The London Aphrodite =

Literary magazine in London (1928–1929)

- Editor: Jack Lindsay; P. R. Stephensen
- Categories: Literary magazine
- Frequency: Bimonthly
- Publisher: Fánfrolico Press
- Founder: Jack Lindsay; P. R. Stephensen
- Founded: 1928
- First issue: August 1928
- Final issue Number: July 1929; 6
- Country: United Kingdom
- Based in: London
- Language: English

The London Aphrodite was a little literary magazine which existed between 1928 and 1929. It is known for its founders Jack Lindsay and P. R. Stephensen. Tim Armstrong described the magazine as an example of micro-modernist publications.

== History and profile ==
The London Aphrodite was first published in August 1928. Its founders and editors were Jack Lindsay and P. R. Stephensen who also owned the publisher of the magazine, Fánfrolico Press. In the first issue it was announced that there would be only six issues of The London Aphrodite. The same issue also contained a manifesto in which the editors attacked another British magazine entitled The London Mercury and its literary approach. Cover page of the each issue was printed in different colours, and it was published on a bimonthly basis.

Some of the contributors were Liam O'Flaherty, Robert Nichols, Kenneth Slessor, Pittendrigh Macgillivray and Stanley Snaith. The final issue of The London Aphrodite appeared in July 1929.
