= Left Review =

Left Review was a journal set up by the British section of the Comintern-sponsored International Union of Revolutionary Writers (previously known as the International Bureau for Revolutionary Literature; also known as the Writers' International), established in 1934 and continued until 1938. Left Review's editorial board was headed by Montagu Slater, Edgell Rickword, Amabel Williams-Ellis, Tom Wintringham and Randall Swingler. From 1936 to 1937 Rickword was the sole editor: he was succeeded by Swingler, who remained at the position until the magazine ended.

The first issue published a position statement by the Writers' International, which declared Britain's economy and culture were in a state of collapse, expressed opposition to fascism and imperialism and support for the Soviet Union. Left Review then invited writers to respond. The issues that followed published responses, such as the one by Lewis Grassic Gibbon in the February 1935 issue, and opinions on the nature of literature. The magazine carried articles on politics and culture, along with some short fiction and poetry. Left Review carried articles by a number of noted left-wing writers, including W. H. Auden, Winifred Holtby, Naomi Mitchison, Storm Jameson, Herbert Read, James Hanley, Arthur Calder-Marshall, and Eric Gill.

In May 1935 Left Review published an editorial strongly criticising the Silver Jubilee celebrations of King George V, arguing such expensive celebrations were inappropriate at a time of high poverty and unemployment. The editorial was signed by several prominent writers and artists, including A. L. Lloyd, Pearl Binder, Tom Wintringham, Eric Gill and Ralph Fox. The same year Anthony Blunt began to contribute to the magazine.

MI5 recorded the names of all contributors to the magazine and kept detailed files on several of Left Review's contributors as possible "security risks", including C. Day-Lewis, Wintringham and Rex Warner.

In 1937 Left Review was subject to criticism after Fredric Warburg revealed in a letter to the New Statesman that Left Review had refused to carry an advertisement for John Dewey's book The Case of Leon Trotsky, which published the report of the Dewey Commission which had defended Trotsky from attacks made on him during Stalin's show trials. In response, Randall Swingler defended the decision not to carry the advertisement, stating "there is a line at which criticism ends and destructive attacks begin, and we regret that this line separates us both from Dr. Goebbels and from Leon Trotsky.".
