= Pageant of Labour =

- Music: Alan Bush
- Lyrics: Matthew Anderson
- Premiere: 15 October 1934: The Crystal Palace, London

The Pageant of Labour was a large-scale musical and dramatic show held at The Crystal Palace, London, England, on 15–20 October 1934. With words by Matthew Anderson and music by Alan Bush, it celebrated the history of the British labour movement, and like most pageants of the era was a mixture of instrumental and choral music, drama and dance. It was organised by the Central Women's Organisation Committee of the London Trades Council and directed by Edward Genn. Bush and Michael Tippett conducted the choir and orchestra. Among the cast was the 15-year-old Nigel Stock.
