= Clifford Rowe =

British painter

Clifford Rowe (1904–1989), also known as Cliff Rowe, was an artist and illustrator born in Wimbledon, South London. Rowe studied at Wimbledon School of Art (1918-1920) and the Royal College of Art (1920-1922).

As well as his painting output, Rowe produced dust jacket designs and illustrations for books, he did promotional commissions for the Attlee Labour government, designs for the 1951 Festival of Britain, commercial work for trade unions, and a number of illustrations for political publications. The majority of Rowe’s work is in The People’s History Museum collections.

== Early career ==
Rowe worked in advertising in the 1920s, where he met R. O. Dunlop and briefly became an exhibiting member of Dunlop's Emotionist Group. In the late 1920s his work designing posters for a left wing bookshop led to his meeting Pat Dooley, the chief executive of the Irish Communist Party. Dooley lent Rowe a copy of the Communist Manifesto which had a strong influence on his Socialist politics.

In 1930 Rowe travelled to Russia and stayed for 18 months, working at the Foreign Workers' Publishing House, and was encouraged that the class struggle in Russia seemed to be the key political force for a new social order. Rowe observed the machinations of the Soviet state, including their use of visual culture for propaganda purposes. Though clearly an influential visit for Rowe, he did not fully support the totalitarian regime and later denounced Stalin's government. In 1932 he exhibited large works in the Soviet Union to celebrate the fiftieth anniversary of the Red Army.

However, Rowe returned, married, to Britain with new confidence and a conviction of artists' use and purpose as social agents working for the common good. Rowe's early works adopt the style of Socialist Realism, later moving to a style more aligned with the New Realism movement. His works tended to show scenes of working life but they could include very anti-establishment images.

== The Artists' International Association (AIA) ==
In 1933 Rowe, together with Pearl Binder, Misha Black, James Fitton, James Boswell, James Holland and Edward Ardizzone, founded the Artists' International Association (AIA).

This was an exhibiting society with the aim of publicising, through their art, their commitment and resistance to the 'Imperialist war on the Soviet Union, Fascism and colonial oppression'. Its aim was the 'Unity of Artists for Peace, Democracy and Cultural Development'.

Two of their most significant exhibitions were The Social Scene, and Artists Against Fascism and War held in 1935. Artists who exhibited, in addition to the AIA members were Agustus Joh, Duncan Grant, Henry Moore and Laura Knight.

The AIA members politicised cultural production and applied it to far-left political campaigns by designing propaganda posters, pamphlets and banners, with the goal of uniting art and activism for a new political order. The AIA was furthermore concerned with addressing the working conditions of the artist, with Rowe leading the view that a Socialist society provides a supportive environment for the artist, while the artist in the West was expected to work under economically precarious and bleak conditions.

The AIA remained a dynamic political body until 1953, organising significant international exhibitions that responded to the changing political landscape through the Second World War, the Spanish Civil War and the Cold War. The Association dropped their political stance in 1953 and reconstituted as a solely exhibiting society until its end in 1971.

== Selected works (written by others, illustrated by Rowe) ==
- Carey, M. C., The Soldier (The Everyday Books series) (J. M. Dent & Sons, 1943)
- The Story of Coal (Bantam Picture Books) (Transatlantic Arts,
