= Paul Rudall =

Paul Rudall (1921–2012) was a Modern British artist, noted for his semi-abstract and abstract works on canvas, board, and paper.

== Work ==
Paul Charles Rudall (1921–2012) was a British painter and art teacher. He represents part of a strong artistic tradition of modern British art, especially Post-War Abstract art. Rudall’s paintings incorporated several stylistic strands, ranging from semi-abstract landscape and still life works to abstracts featuring a characteristic set of changing shapes, often centered on the human figure.

Rudall’s work has been exhibited at numerous regional galleries in the United Kingdom focusing on Modern British art. During the early post-war period, Rudall exhibited with the Swindon Artists Society (1945), the Pictures for Schools exhibition (Victoria and Albert Museum, 1947) and the Artists for Peace exhibition (London 1952); he held solo exhibitions at the Bristol Folk House (1946) and the Swindon Arts Centre (1947). In 1948, he provided commissioned works for the left-wing periodical Our Time.

His most notable subsequent solo exhibitions were held at the Swindon Art Gallery (1985), the Wilson Hale gallery in Golborne Road, London (1989, 1990) and the Moreton Street gallery in Pimlico, London (2001–2004). Paintings and drawings by Rudall are held in UK public collections at Hereford Museum and Art Gallery, Swindon Museum and Art Gallery, Chippenham Museum, Bath Victoria Art Gallery and the Imperial War Museum.

== Biography ==
Paul Rudall was born in West London on 6 February 1921. During his school days in London, Paul was awarded a scholarship to attend Regent Street Polytechnic, where he was taught by Clifford Ellis. Some of his classes were held at Saint Martin’s School of Art. Having left primary education by 1937, he initially worked as a layout artist in the Adelphi area of central London, prior to national wartime service in the RAF. Paul’s family were bombed out of London during World War Two and moved to Swindon, where his father was hired at the Vickers-Armstrong factory. In 1943, Rudall joined the Artists’ International Association (AIA) and the Swindon Contemporary Art Society, where he associated with contemporary artists such as George Downs, Walter Poole and Desmond Morris, and the poet Jack Beeching.

Following wartime service in the Royal Air Force working on radar sites in the Cotswolds, Rudall used an ex-Serviceman’s grant to enrol at Bath Academy of Art at Corsham Court, which was then led by Clifford and Rosemary Ellis. With fewer than 100 students in its early post-war years, Corsham presented a pioneering art syllabus and an atmosphere of freedom to many promising young artists. Among Rudall’s student contemporaries at Corsham were the Kenyan sculptor Gregory Maloba, who later created the famous monument to Ugandan independence in Kampala, the artists Henry Cliffe, Bobbie Cox, Hubert (Nibs) Dalwood, John Eaves, and Paul’s future wife, Rosemary Williams, whom he married in 1951. The Corsham students were taught by an impressive range of artists, headed by William Scott and Kenneth Armitage and featuring Julian Trevelyan, who with his wife Mary Fedden remained friendly with Paul during his London days in the early 1950s.

After leaving Corsham, Rudall took up teaching posts, initially as Head of Art at Chiswick Grammar School (1949-1951) and subsequently as Head of Art at Dudley Boys Grammar School (1952-1982), as well as lecturing for Birmingham University Extramural Department and the Workers Educational Association in the West Midlands. He also provided commissioned woodcuts to illustrate small books published by Myriad Press. In 1962, Rudall designed a commissioned public mosaic in Birdcage Walk shopping precinct, Dudley. He retired from teaching in 1982, and moved back to Bath to focus on painting, thereby commencing a highly creative period in terms of artistic productivity and experimentation.
