= Herbert Hodge =

- Born: Herbert Lawrence Hodge; February 20, 1901; Westminster, London, England
- Occupation(s): Taxi driver, BBC radio presenter

Herbert Lawrence Hodge (20 February 1901 – ) was a London taxi driver, author, and BBC radio personality.

He appeared as a castaway on the BBC Radio programme Desert Island Discs on 16 July 1943.

Hodge's autobiography, It's Draughty In Front, was published in 1938. He stood for the New Party in Limehouse at the 1931 General Election.

== Bibliography ==
- It's Draughty In Front: The Autobiography Of A London Taxidriver. Michael Joseph. 1938.
- Cab, Sir?. Michael Joseph. 1939.
- I drive a taxi. Fact, Limited. 1938.
- A Cockney on Main Street. 1945.
