= Randall Swingler =

English poet (1909–1967)

Randall Carline Swingler MM (28 May 1909 – 19 June 1967) was an English poet, writing extensively in the 1930s in the communist interest.

== Early life and education ==
His was a prosperous upper middle class Anglican family in Aldershot, with an industrial background in the Midlands and earlier aristocratic roots in Scotland. His uncle and godfather was Randall Davidson, the Archbishop of Canterbury (1903 – 1928) and he was the cousin of the writer Sir Walter Scott. He was educated at Winchester College, and New College, Oxford.

Swingler served with the British Army in Italy in the Second World War. His egalitarian beliefs led him to refuse a commission and he joined the Royal Corps of Signals as a private soldier, repeatedly refusing offers of a battlefield commission. He saw action in the Italian campaign. In 1945, Corporal Swingler was awarded the Military Medal (MM) "in recognition of gallant and distinguished services in Italy".

== Music and literature ==
Swingler was an accomplished flautist, playing regularly with the professional London orchestras. He was later much involved in musical collaboration as a librettist, including song cycles with Benjamin Britten (Advance Democracy, 1938), Alan Bush (The Winter Journey, 1946) and Alan Rawsthorne (A Canticle of Man, 1953). His friend John Sykes also set the four poems of Homage to John Dowland in 1957. Among several notable pieces, Swingler co-wrote Ballad of Heroes with Britten and the poet W. H. Auden and wrote a new version of the English lyrics of the Polish revolutionary song "Whirlwinds of Danger". There are settings of his verse by Arnold Cooke, Christian Darnton, Erik Chisholm, Norman Demuth, John Ireland, Elisabeth Lutyens, and Bernard Stevens.

His war poetry (1935-1945), including examples such as 'Heavy Shelling at Night', 'Briefing for Invasion' and 'The Day the War Ended...' was collected in The Years of Anger, first published in 1946. Since his death, Swingler has been recognised as a central figure in communist English poetry. His biographer, the poet Andy Croft, has written that, as an editor, speaker, organiser, journalist, critic, playwright, poet, librettist, novelist and publisher, he was one of the leading figures in the cultural activities of the Communist Party. Croft has also calls him "the last of the Georgian poets" and says that his poetry "had a moral and political urgency".

Swingler operated in North London, as a close associate of Nancy Cunard, sometimes lending his name. He was one of the organisers of the covert Writer's Group of the late 1930s, attempting to co-ordinate a 'literary policy' of the Left. He was also involved in work for the Unity Theatre, and was the literary editor of the Daily Worker, often reviewing books for The Times, The Manchester Guardian, amongst other newspapers.

== Politics ==
Swingler joined the Communist Party of Great Britain (CPGB) in 1934. His numerous ventures as a literary entrepreneur included the setting up of Fore Publications (1938), editing the magazines Left Review (from 1937 to 1938), Arena, Seven (taken over in wartime, mainly for the paper stock), Our Time, and the publishing of the Key Books, and later Key Poets series. These proved more influential than his Blake-flavoured verse, which has consistently been criticised (and scarcely defended, except by Andy Croft).

In 1952, Swingler wrote a poem titled "The Ballad of Herod Templer" mocking British general Gerald Templer and his attempts to destroy communists during the Malayan Emergency. The poem is believed to have been inspired by the British Malayan headhunting scandal.

With his brother, the Labour MP Stephen Swingler, he was involved in Barnett Stross's Lidice Shall Live campaign, and wrote the words to the piece "A Rose For Lidice" (music by Alan Rawsthorne), which was performed at the opening of the memorial rose garden in Lidice in 1955.

He left the CPGB in 1956. He was a founder of E. P. Thompson's The New Reasoner (from 1957).

== Personal life ==
He was married to the concert pianist and tutor at the Guildhall, Geraldine Peppin. They had an open marriage and Swingler had an affair with actor and activist Ann Davies from 1939 to 1941.

Swingler died unexpectedly on 19 Jun 1967 at Charing Cross Hospital. Westminster. His daughter Judith married the composer Edward Williams. She died in 2022.

== Works ==
- Crucifixus (1932) play
- Difficult Morning (1933) poems
- The Left Song Book, (1938) compiled with Alan Bush
- The Years of Anger – poems
- The God in the Cave (1950) poems
- Selected Poems of Randall Swingler (2000) edited by Andy Croft
