= Concerto for Piano and Wind Instruments (Stravinsky) =

Composition by Igor Stravinsky

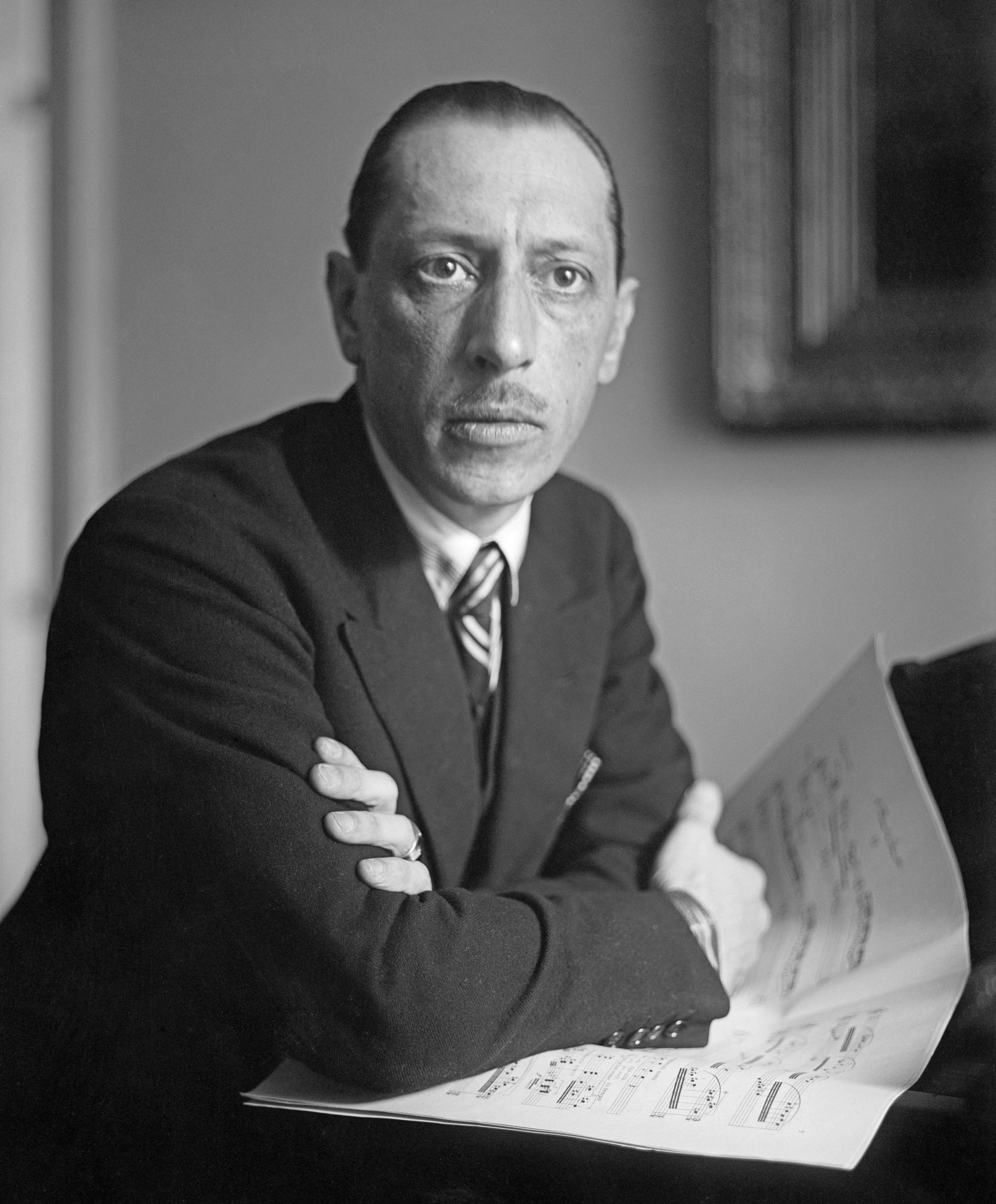
Igor Stravinsky in the 1920s

The Concerto for Piano and Wind Instruments was written by Igor Stravinsky in Paris in 1923–24. This work was revised in 1950.

It was composed four years after the Symphonies of Wind Instruments, which he wrote upon his arrival in Paris after his stay in Switzerland. These two compositions are from Stravinsky's neoclassical period, and represent a departure from the composer's previous Russian style, in which he produced works such as The Rite of Spring.

This concerto numbers among many works for piano written about the same time to be played by the composer himself. This is also true of Capriccio for Piano and Orchestra (1929), his Sonata of 1924 and his Serenade in A (1925). He kept the performance rights to himself for a number of years, wanting the engagements for playing this work for himself, as well as urgently desiring to keep "incompetent or Romantic hands" from "interpreting" the piece before undiscriminating audiences.

== Orchestration ==
The concerto, as described in its name, is scored for solo piano accompanied by an ensemble of wind instruments. The instrumentation of the wind section is what would be found in a standard symphony orchestra: two flutes, piccolo, two oboes, cor anglais, two clarinets, two bassoons (second bassoon doubling contrabassoon), four horns, four trumpets, three trombones, and tuba. The work also calls for a section of double basses (divided in 3) and a timpani player (4 drums recommended).

Although combining winds and piano was unusual at the time, the form had been explored earlier in the twentieth century and would be explored later.

== Première ==
The Concerto for Piano and Wind Instruments was first given in an arrangement for two pianos at a private concert in the salon of Winnaretta Singer, Princess de Polignac when it was performed by Jean Wiener and Stravinsky ten days prior to its official premiere. The concerto debuted under Serge Koussevitzky at the Opera of Paris on 22 May 1924 with the composer playing the piano. Koussevitzky had requested such a work of Stravinsky.

Stravinsky made his British radio debut in the British premiere of the work, on 19 June 1927, with the Wireless Symphony Orchestra (the fore-runner of the BBC Symphony Orchestra) conducted by his friend and champion Edward Clark.

In 1925 Stravinsky recorded the first movement of this work in New York, for the Aeolian Company's Duo-Art reproducing piano, on roll no. 528. The first and so far only public performance took place on 10 June 1962, at Royce Hall in Los Angeles, with members of the Los Angeles Festival Orchestra conducted by Franz Waxman. Jakob Gimpel was the soloist in the other movements, and Harold Schonberg reviewed the concert in the New York Times for 12 June 1962, on page 39.

== Sources ==
- Boosey.com
