= Igor Stravinsky =

Russian composer (1882–1971)

- Игорь Стравинский
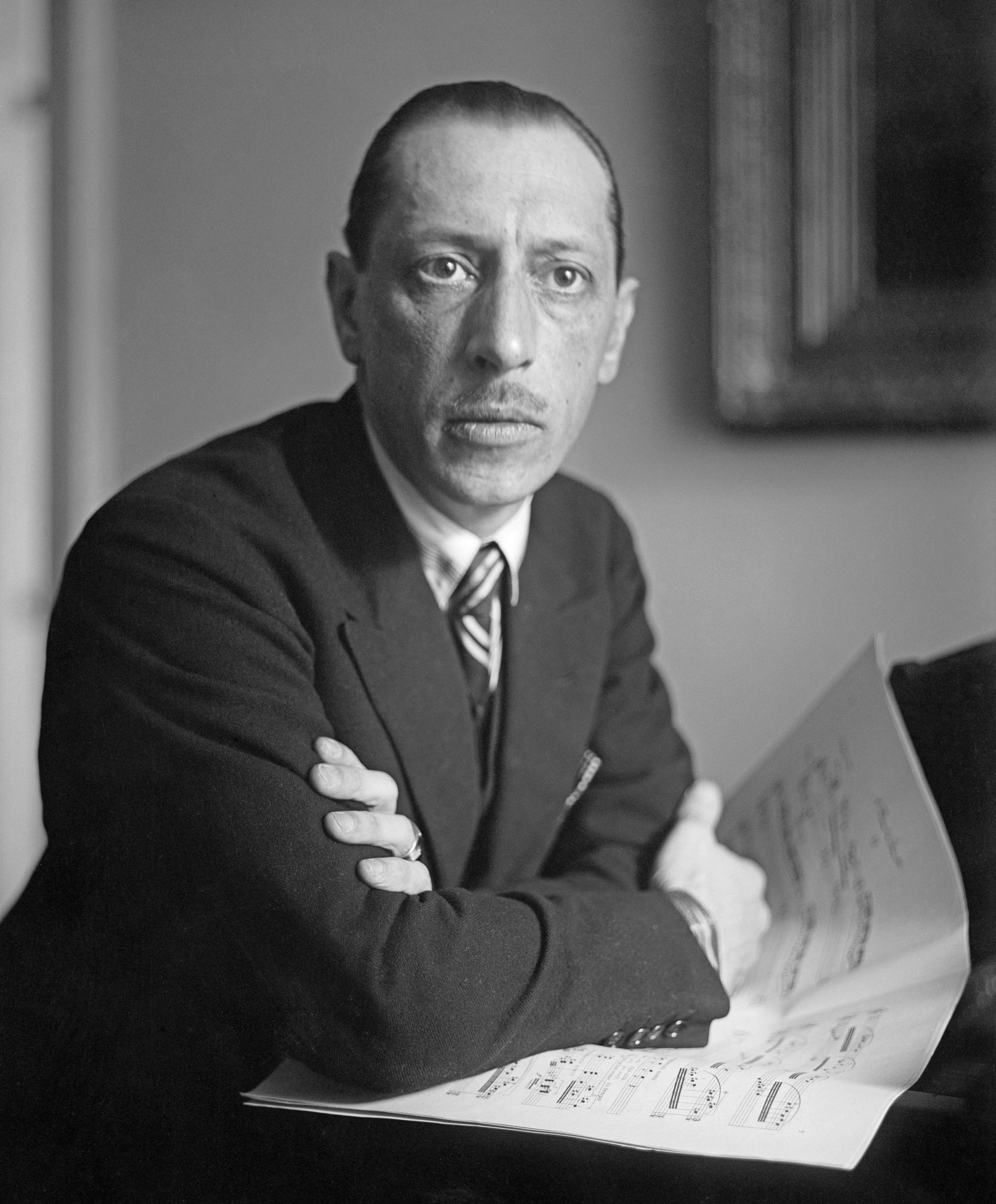
- Stravinsky in the early 1920s
- Born: 17 June 1882; Oranienbaum, Saint Petersburg, Russia
- Died: 6 April 1971 (aged 88); New York City, US
- Occupations: Composer; conductor; pianist
- Works: List of compositions
- Spouses: Yekaterina Nosenko (m. 1906; died 1939); Vera de Bosset (m. 1940)
- Children: 4, including Théodore and Soulima
- Father: Fyodor Stravinsky

Igor Fyodorovich Stravinsky (Note: In this name that follows East Slavic naming customs, the patronymic is Fyodorovich and the family name is Stravinsky.) (Note: /strəˈvɪnski/; Russian: Игорь Фёдорович Стравинский, IPA: [ˈiɡərʲ ˈfʲɵdərəvʲɪtɕ strɐˈvʲinskʲɪj]) (17 June [O.S. 5 June] 1882 – 6 April 1971) was a Russian composer and conductor with French (from 1934) and American citizenship (from 1945). He is widely considered one of the most important and influential composers of the 20th century and a pivotal figure in modernist music.

Born into a musical family in Saint Petersburg, Stravinsky grew up taking piano and music theory lessons. While studying law at the University of Saint Petersburg, he met Nikolai Rimsky-Korsakov and studied music under him until the latter's death in 1908. Soon after, Stravinsky met impresario Sergei Diaghilev, who commissioned him to write three ballets for the Ballets Russes's Paris seasons: The Firebird (1910), Petrushka (1911), and The Rite of Spring (1913), the last of which caused a near-riot at the premiere due to its avant-garde nature and later changed the way composers understood rhythmic structure.

Stravinsky's compositional career is often divided into three main periods: his Russian period (1913–1920), his neoclassical period (1920–1951), and his serial period (1954–1968). During his Russian period, Stravinsky was heavily influenced by Russian styles and folklore. Works such as Renard (1916) and Les noces (1923) drew upon Russian folk poetry, while compositions like L'Histoire du soldat (1918) integrated these folk elements with popular musical forms, including the tango, waltz, ragtime, and chorale. His neoclassical period exhibited themes and techniques from the classical period, like the use of the sonata form in his Octet (1923) and use of Greek mythological themes in works including Apollon musagète (1927), Oedipus rex (1927), and Persephone (1935). In his serial period, Stravinsky turned towards compositional techniques from the Second Viennese School like Arnold Schoenberg's twelve-tone technique. In Memoriam Dylan Thomas (1954) was the first of his compositions to be fully based on the technique, and Canticum Sacrum (1956) was his first to be based on a tone row. Stravinsky's last major work was the Requiem Canticles (1966), which was performed at his funeral.

While many supporters were confused by Stravinsky's constant stylistic changes, later writers recognized his versatile language as important in the development of modernist music. Stravinsky's revolutionary ideas influenced composers as diverse as Aaron Copland, Philip Glass, Béla Bartók, and Pierre Boulez, who were all challenged to innovate music in areas beyond tonality, especially rhythm and musical form. In 1998, Time magazine listed Stravinsky as one of the 100 most influential people of the century. Stravinsky died of pulmonary edema on 6 April 1971 in New York City, having left six memoirs written with his friend and assistant, Robert Craft, as well as an earlier autobiography and a series of lectures.

== Life ==
=== Early life in Russia, 1882–1901 ===
Arms of the Polish Soulima family, from which Stravinsky's family descended

Igor Fyodorovich Stravinsky was born on 17 June [O.S. 5 June] 1882 in Oranienbaum, Russia—a town now known as Lomonosov, about 50 kilometers (31 mi) west of Saint Petersburg. His mother, Anna Kirillovna Stravinskaya (Note: By Eastern Slavic naming customs, the male form Stravinsky corresponds to the female form Stravinskaya.) (née Kholodovskaya), was an amateur singer and pianist from an established family of landowners. His father, Fyodor Ignatyevich Stravinsky, was a bass at the Mariinsky Theater, descended from a line of Polish landowners. The name "Stravinsky" is of Polish origin, deriving from the Strava river in the Polish–Lithuanian Commonwealth. The family was originally called "Soulima-Stravinsky", bearing the Soulima arms, but "Soulima" was dropped after the partitions of Poland.

The Stravinsky family vacationed in Oranienbaum during summers, and their primary residence was an apartment along the Kryukov Canal, near the Mariinsky Theater. Stravinsky was baptized hours after birth and joined to the Russian Orthodox Church in St. Nicholas Cathedral. Constantly in fear of the short-tempered Fyodor and indifferent towards Anna, Stravinsky lived there for the first 27 years of his life with three siblings: Roman and Yury, his older siblings who irritated him immensely, and Gury, his close younger brother with whom he said he found "the love and understanding denied us by our parents". Stravinsky was educated by the family's governess until the age of 11, when he began attending the Second Saint Petersburg Gymnasium, a school which he recalled hating because he had few friends.

From the age of nine, Stravinsky studied privately with a piano teacher. He later wrote that his parents saw no musical talent in him due to his lack of technical skills; Stravinsky frequently improvised instead of practicing assigned pieces. His excellent sight-reading skill prompted him to frequently read vocal scores from Fyodor's vast personal library. At around the age of 10, Stravinsky began regularly attending performances at the Mariinsky Theater, where he was introduced to Russian repertoire as well as Italian and French opera; by the age of 16, he attended rehearsals at the theater five or six days a week. By the age of 14, Stravinsky had mastered the solo part of Mendelssohn's Piano Concerto No. 1, and at the age of 15, he transcribed for solo piano a string quartet by Alexander Glazunov.

=== Higher education, 1901–1909 ===
==== Student compositions ====
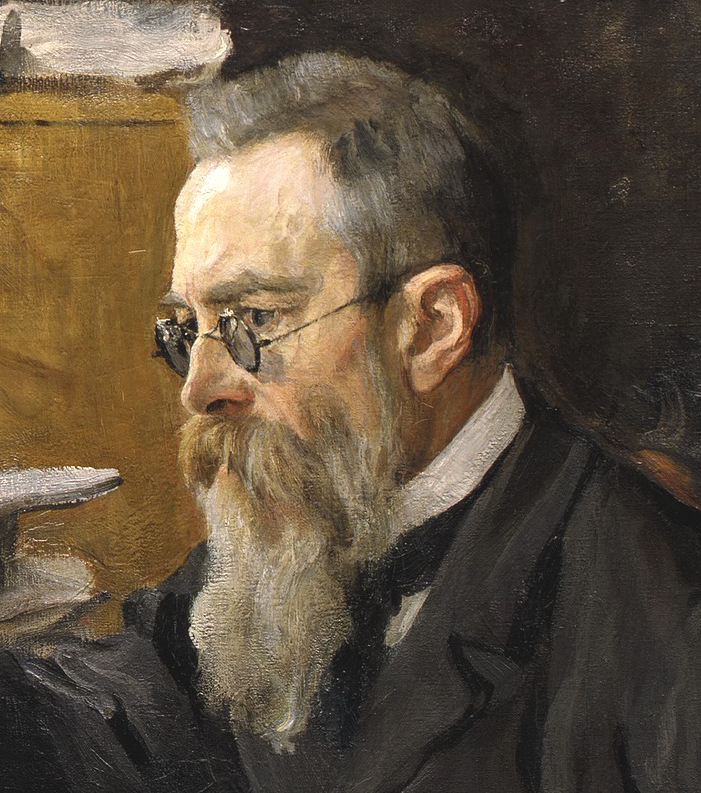
Nikolai Rimsky-Korsakov, painted by Valentin Serov in 1898

Despite his musical passion and ability, Stravinsky's parents expected him to study law at the University of Saint Petersburg, and he enrolled there in 1901. However, according to his own account, he was a bad student and attended few of the optional lectures. In exchange for agreeing to attend law school, Stravinsky's parents allowed for lessons in harmony and counterpoint. At university, he befriended Vladimir Rimsky-Korsakov, a son of leading Russian composer Nikolai Rimsky-Korsakov. (Note: In his 1936 autobiography, Stravinsky described his admiration for Rimsky-Korsakov and Alexander Glazunov, both leading figures of Russian music at the time: "I was specially drawn to [Rimsky-Korsakov] by his melodic and harmonic inspiration, which then seemed to me full of freshness; to [Glazunov] by his feeling for symphonic form; and to both by their scholarly workmanship. I need hardly stress how much I longed to attain this ideal of perfection in which I really saw the highest degree of art; and with all the feeble means at my disposal I assiduously strove to imitate them in my attempts at composition.") During summer vacation of 1902, Stravinsky traveled with Vladimir to Heidelberg – where the latter's family was staying – bringing a portfolio of pieces to demonstrate to Rimsky-Korsakov. While Rimsky-Korsakov was not stunned, he was impressed enough to insist that Stravinsky continue lessons but advised against him entering the Saint Petersburg Conservatory due to its rigorous environment. Importantly, Rimsky-Korsakov agreed personally to advise him on his compositions.

After Fyodor died in 1902, Stravinsky became more independent and increasingly involved in Rimsky-Korsakov's circle of artists. Stravinsky's first major task from Rimsky-Korsakov was the four-movement Piano Sonata in F♯ minor in the style of Glazunov and Tchaikovsky – Stravinsky paused temporarily to write a cantata for Rimsky-Korsakov's 60th birthday celebration, which the latter described as "not bad". Soon after finishing the sonata, Stravinsky began his large-scale Symphony in E♭, (Note: The Symphony in E-flat was designated Opus 1, though Stravinsky's inconsistent use of Opus numbers makes them futile.) the first draft of which he finished in 1905. That year, the dedicatee of the Piano Sonata, Nikolay Richter, performed it at a recital hosted by the Rimsky-Korsakovs, marking the first public premiere of a Stravinsky piece.

After the events of Bloody Sunday in January 1905 caused the university to close, Stravinsky was not able to take his final exams, resulting in his graduation with a half-diploma. As he began spending more time in Rimsky-Korsakov's circle of artists, Stravinsky became increasingly cramped in the stylistically conservative atmosphere: modern music was questioned, and concerts of contemporary music were looked down upon. The group occasionally attended chamber concerts oriented to modern music, and while Rimsky-Korsakov and his colleague Anatoly Lyadov hated attending, Stravinsky remembered the concerts as intriguing and intellectually stimulating, being the first place he was exposed to French composers like Franck, Dukas, Fauré, and Debussy. Nevertheless, Stravinsky remained loyal to Rimsky-Korsakov – musicologist Eric Walter White suspected that the former believed that compliance with the latter was necessary to succeed in the Russian music world. Stravinsky later wrote that Rimsky-Korsakov's musical conservatism was justified and helped him build the foundation that would become the base of his style. In 1908, he sent Rimsky-Korsakov the score to Feu d'artifice. It was returned with the note: "Not delivered on account of death of addressee."

==== First marriage ====
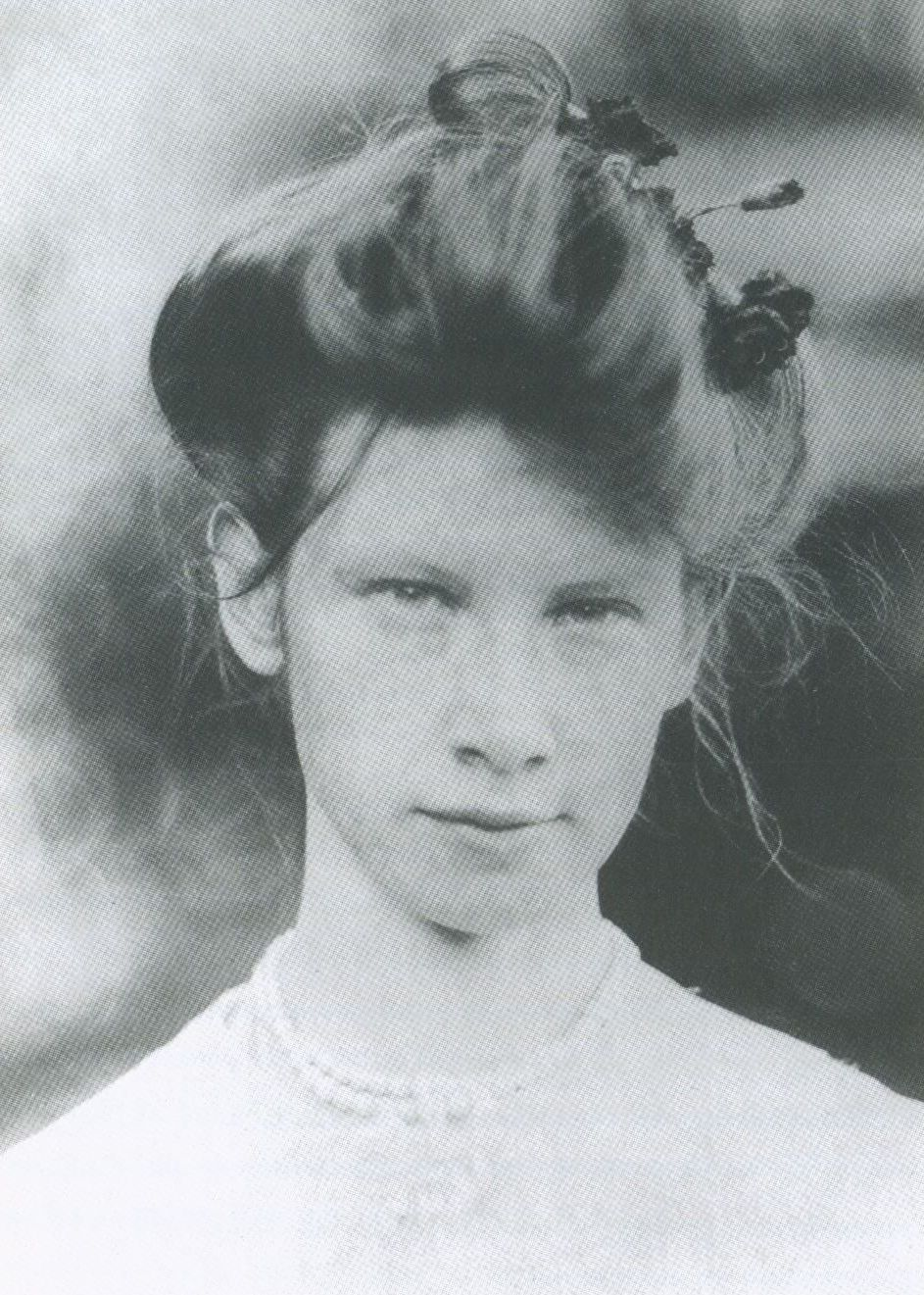
Yekaterina Stravinsky in 1907

In August 1905, Stravinsky announced his engagement to Yekaterina Nosenko, his first cousin, whom he had met in 1890 during a family trip. He later recalled:

From our first hour together we both seemed to realize that we would one day marry—or so we told each other later. Perhaps we were always more like brother and sister. I was a deeply lonely child and I wanted a sister of my own. Catherine, who was my first cousin, came into my life as a kind of long-wanted sister ... We were from then until her death extremely close, and closer than lovers sometimes are, for mere lovers may be strangers though they live and love together all their lives ... Catherine was my dearest friend and playmate ... until we grew into our marriage.

The two had grown close during family trips, encouraging each other's interest in painting and drawing, swimming together often, going on wild raspberry picks, helping build a tennis court, playing piano duet music, and later organizing group readings with their other cousins of books and political tracts from Fyodor's personal library. In July 1901, Stravinsky expressed infatuation with Lyudmila Kuxina, Yekaterina's best friend, but after the self-described "summer romance" had ended, the relationship between Stravinsky and Yekaterina began developing into a furtive romance. Between their intermittent family visits, Yekaterina studied painting at the Académie Colarossi. The couple married on 24 January 1906 at the Church of the Annunciation five miles (eight kilometers) north of Saint Petersburg – because marriage between first cousins was banned, they procured a priest who did not ask their identities, and the only guests present were Rimsky-Korsakov's sons. The couple soon had two children: a son named Théodore, born in 1907, and a daughter named Ludmila, born the following year.

After finishing the many revisions of the Symphony in E♭ in 1907, Stravinsky wrote Faun and Shepherdess, a setting of three Pushkin poems for mezzo-soprano and orchestra. Rimsky-Korsakov organized the first public premiere of Stravinsky's work with the Imperial Court Orchestra in April 1907, programming the Symphony in E♭ and Faun and Shepherdess. Rimsky-Korsakov's death in June 1908 caused Stravinsky deep mourning, and Stravinsky later recalled that Funeral Song, which he composed in memory of his mentor, was "the best of my works before The Firebird".

=== International fame, 1909–1920 ===
==== Ballets for Diaghilev ====
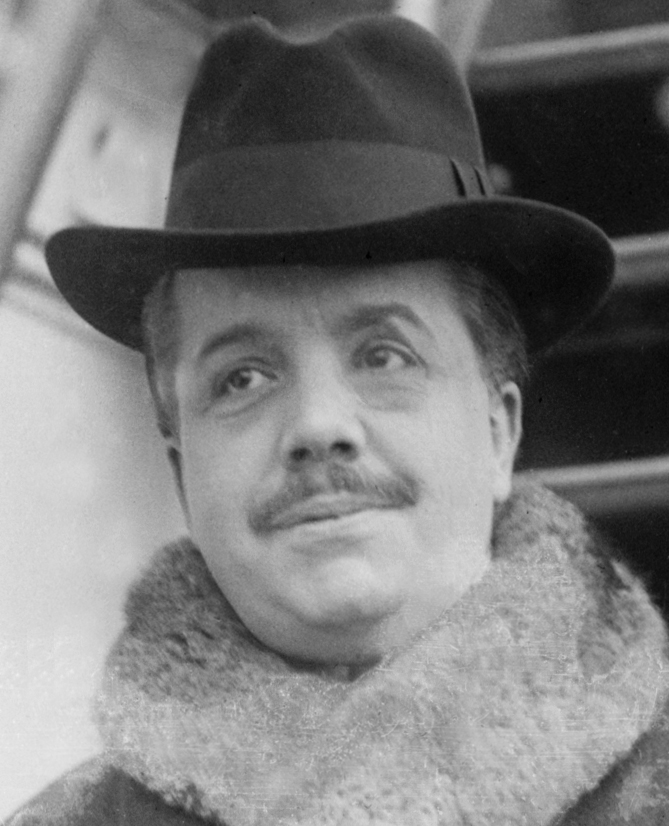
Diaghilev in 1916

In 1898, Sergei Diaghilev, an impresario, founded the Russian art magazine Mir iskusstva, but after it ended publication in 1904, he turned towards Paris for artistic opportunities rather than his native Russia. In 1907, Diaghilev presented a five-concert series of Russian music at the Paris Opera; the following year, he staged the Paris premiere of Rimsky-Korsakov's version of Boris Godunov. Diaghilev attended the February 1909 premiere of two new Stravinsky works: Scherzo fantastique and Feu d'artifice, both lively orchestral movements featuring bright orchestration and unique harmonic techniques. The vivid color and tone of Stravinsky's works intrigued Diaghilev, and the latter subsequently commissioned the former to orchestrate music by Chopin for parts of the ballet Les Sylphides. This ballet was presented by Diaghilev's ballet company, the Ballets Russes, in April 1909, and while the company scored successes with Parisian audiences, Stravinsky was working on Act I of his first opera The Nightingale.

As the Ballets Russes faced financial issues, Diaghilev wanted a new ballet with distinctly Russian music and design, something that had recently become popular with French and other Western audiences (likely due to the group of Russian classical composers known as The Five, according to musicologist Richard Taruskin); his company settled on the subject of the mythical Firebird. Diaghilev asked multiple composers to write the ballet's score, including Lyadov and Nikolai Tcherepnin, but after none committed to the project, Diaghilev turned to Stravinsky, who gladly accepted the task. During the ballet's production, Stravinsky became close with Diaghilev's artistic circle, who were impressed by his enthusiasm to learn more about non-musical art forms. The Firebird premiered in Paris (as L'Oiseau de feu) on 25 June 1910 to widespread critical acclaim, making Stravinsky an overnight sensation. Many critics praised his alignment with Russian nationalist music. Stravinsky later recollected that after the premiere and subsequent performances, he met many figures in the Paris art scene; Debussy was brought on stage after the premiere and invited Stravinsky to dinner, beginning a lifelong friendship between the two. (Note: After the premiere of Stravinsky's The Rite of Spring in 1913, Debussy expressed misgivings about him. Saint-John Perse, who attended rehearsals of The Rite with Debussy, later told Stravinsky that the latter was initially excited about the work but that "he changed when he understood that with it you had taken the attention of the new generation away from him". Though Debussy continued to insult Stravinsky with others, he never expressed this to the latter himself, and a year after Debussy's death in 1918, Stravinsky discovered that the third movement of the former's En blanc et noir was dedicated to him. Stravinsky later dedicated the Symphonies of Wind Instruments to the memory of Debussy.)

The Stravinsky family moved to Lausanne for the birth of their third child, a son named Soulima, and it was there that Stravinsky began work on a Konzertstück for piano and orchestra depicting the tale of a puppet coming to life. After hearing the early drafts, Diaghilev convinced Stravinsky to turn it into a ballet for the 1911 season. The resulting work, Petrushka (under the French spelling Petrouchka), premiered in Paris on 13 June 1911 to equal acclaim as The Firebird, and Stravinsky became established as one of the most advanced young theater composers of his time.

Opening measures of the "Sacrificial Dance" from The Rite of Spring, showing the odd meters and chords (Note: See "Sacrificial Dance" from The Rite of Spring (audio, animated score) on YouTube, Boston Symphony Orchestra, Michael Tilson Thomas conducting (1972))

While composing The Firebird, Stravinsky conceived an idea for a work about what he called "a solemn pagan rite: sage elders, seated in a circle, watched a young girl dance herself to death". He immediately shared the idea with Nicholas Roerich, a friend and painter of pagan subjects. When Stravinsky told him about the idea, Diaghilev excitedly agreed to commission the work. After the premiere of Petrushka, Stravinsky settled at his family's residence in Ustilug in the Vladimir-Volynsky Uyezd of Volhynia Governorate and fleshed out the details of the ballet with Roerich, later finishing the work in Clarens, Switzerland. The result was The Rite of Spring (Le sacre du printemps), which depicted pagan rituals in Slavonic tribes and used many avant-garde techniques, including uneven rhythms and meters, superimposed harmonies, atonality, and extensive instrumentation. With radical choreography by the young Vaslav Nijinsky, the ballet's experimental nature caused a near-riot at its premiere at the Théâtre des Champs-Élysées on 29 May 1913. (Note: The uproar at the premiere was prompted at least as much by Nijinsky's unconventional choreography as by Stravinsky's music, which was largely inaudible over the hubbub. People whistled, insulted the performers, shouted, and laughed. Fights broke out in the auditorium. Nevertheless, the dancers, and the orchestra under Pierre Monteux, continued to the end of the work.)

==== Illness and wartime collaborations ====
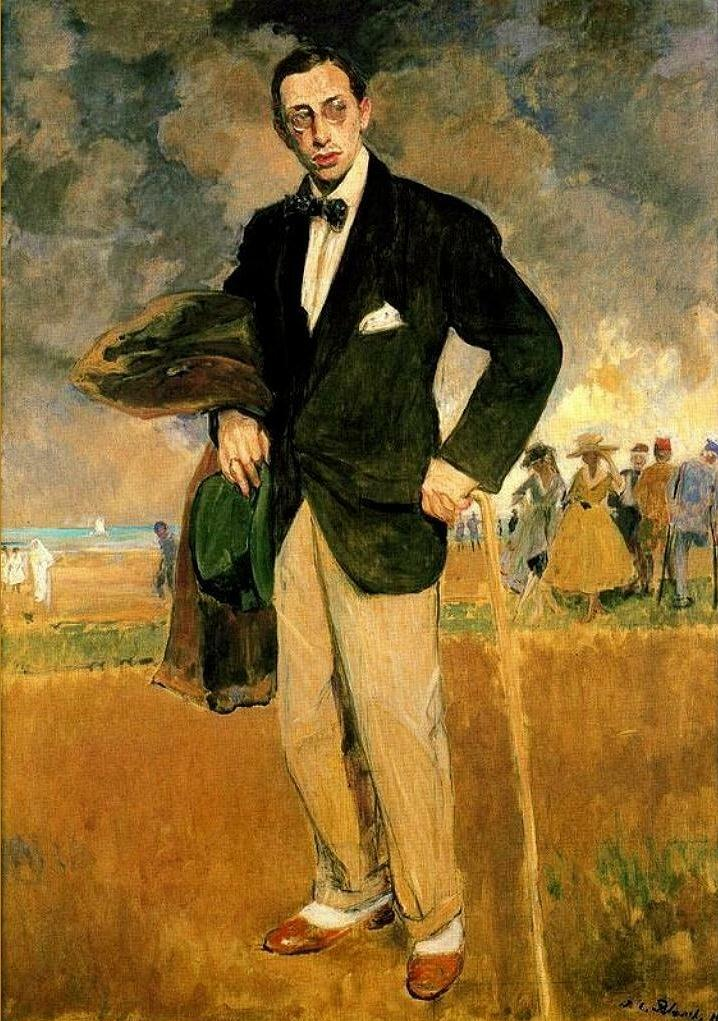
Portrait of Stravinsky by Jacques-Émile Blanche (1915)

Soon after, Stravinsky was admitted to a hospital for typhoid fever and stayed in recovery for five weeks; numerous colleagues visited him, including Debussy, Manuel de Falla, Maurice Ravel, (Note: In early 1913, Stravinsky and Ravel collaborated on a completion of Mussorgsky's unfinished opera Khovanshchina as commissioned by Diaghilev, but Stravinsky's illness prevented him from attending the premiere. Later in life, Stravinsky criticized the arrangement, writing that he was opposed to rearranging the work of another artist, especially one of such prestige as Mussorgsky.) and Florent Schmitt. Upon returning to his family in Ustilug, Stravinsky continued work on his opera The Nightingale, with an official commission from the Moscow Free Theatre. In early 1914, Yekaterina contracted tuberculosis and was admitted to a sanatorium in Leysin, where the couple's fourth child, a daughter named Maria Milena, was born. There, Stravinsky finished The Nightingale, but after the Moscow Free Theatre closed before the premiere, Diaghilev agreed to stage the opera. The May 1914 premiere was moderately successful; critics' high expectations after the tumultuous Rite of Spring were not met, though fellow composers were impressed by the music's emotion and free treatment of counterpoint and themes.

In early July 1914, while his family resided in Switzerland near Yekaterina, Stravinsky traveled to Russia to retrieve texts for his next work, a ballet-cantata depicting Russian wedding traditions titled Les noces. Soon after he returned, World War I began, and the Stravinskys lived in Switzerland until 1920, (Note: The subsequent Russian Revolution in 1917 made it dangerous for Stravinsky to return to Russia, and he never did except for a brief visit in 1962.) initially residing in Clarens and later Morges. During the first months of the war, Stravinsky intensely researched Russian folk poetry and prepared librettos for numerous works to be composed in the coming years, including Les noces, Renard, Pribaoutki, and other song cycles. Stravinsky met numerous Swiss-French artists during his time in Morges, including writer Charles F. Ramuz, with whom he collaborated on the small-scale theater work L'Histoire du soldat. The eleven-musician and two-dancer show was designed for easy travel, but after a premiere run funded by Werner Reinhart, all other performances were canceled due to the Spanish flu epidemic.

Stravinsky's income from performance royalties was suddenly cut off when his Germany-based publisher suspended operations due to the war. To keep his family afloat, Stravinsky sold numerous manuscripts and accepted commissions from wealthy impresarios; one such commission included Renard, a theater work completed in 1916 upon a request from Princesse Edmond de Polignac. Additionally, Stravinsky made a new concert suite from The Firebird and sold it to a London publisher in an attempt to regain copyright control over the ballet. (Note: Stravinsky's early works were published by Moscow-based firms, but because Russia was not a signatory to the Berne Convention on international copyright regulations, many of his works composed before gaining French citizenship in 1931 (including The Firebird) were not protected by copyright outside of Russia.) Diaghilev continued to organize Ballets Russes shows across Europe, including two charity concerts for the Red Cross, where Stravinsky made his conducting debut with The Firebird. When the Ballets Russes traveled to Rome in April 1917, Stravinsky met Spanish artist Pablo Picasso, and the two adventured around Italy; a commedia dell'arte they saw in Naples inspired the ballet Pulcinella, (Note: Pulcinella's score is an arrangement of music by 18th-century Italian composers Giovanni Battista Pergolesi, Domenico Gallo, Fortunato Chelleri, and Alessandro Parisotti.) which premiered in Paris in May 1920 with designs by Picasso.

=== France, 1920–1939 ===
==== Turn towards neoclassicism ====
After the war ended, Stravinsky decided that his residence in Switzerland was too far from Europe's musical activity, and briefly moved his family to Carantec. In September 1920, they moved to the home of French fashion designer Coco Chanel, an associate of Diaghilev's; there, Stravinsky composed the Symphonies of Wind Instruments, his early neoclassical work. After his relationship with Chanel developed into an affair, Stravinsky moved his family to the white émigré-hub Biarritz in May 1921, partly due to the presence of his other lover Vera de Bosset. At the time, Vera was married to former Ballet Russes stage designer Serge Sudeikin, though she later divorced him to marry Stravinsky. Though Yekaterina became aware of Stravinsky's infidelity, the couple never divorced, likely due to his refusal to separate. (Note: The complications that arose from traveling with Vera drove Stravinsky to request visas "for me and my secretary, Mme Vera Sudeikina" in 1924. The two grew so close that in 1929, Stravinsky told his publisher to give Vera the manuscript for one of his works, as she was returning to his home soon after.)

In 1921, Stravinsky signed a contract with the player piano company Pleyel to create piano roll arrangements of his music. He received a studio at their factory on the Rue Rochechouart, where he reorchestrated Les noces for a small ensemble including player piano. Stravinsky transcribed many of his major works for the mechanical pianos, and the Pleyel premises remained his Paris base until 1933, even after the player piano had been largely supplanted by electrical gramophone recording. Stravinsky signed another contract in 1924, this time with the Aeolian Company in London, producing rolls that included comments about the work by Stravinsky that were engraved into the rolls. He stopped working with player pianos in 1930 when the Aeolian Company's London branch was dissolved.

The interest in Pushkin shared by Stravinsky and Diaghilev led to Mavra, a comic opera begun in 1921 that exhibited the former's rejection of Rimsky-Korsakov's style and his turn towards classic Russian operatists like Tchaikovsky, Glinka, and Dargomyzhsky. Yet, after the 1922 premiere, the work's tame nature – compared to the innovative music Stravinsky had come to be known for – disappointed critics. In 1923, Stravinsky finished orchestrating Les noces, settling on a percussion ensemble including four pianos. The Ballets Russes staged the ballet-cantata that June, (Note: Les noces was the last work Stravinsky ever wrote for the Ballets Russes, likely to due a disassociation from stage music onset by his religious crisis.) and although it initially received moderate reviews, the London production received a flurry of critical attacks, leading English writer H. G. Wells to publish an open letter in support of the work. During this period, Stravinsky expanded his involvement in conducting and piano performance. He conducted the premiere of his Octet in 1923 and served as the soloist for the premiere of his Piano Concerto in 1924. Following its debut, he embarked on a tour, performing the concerto in over 40 concerts.

==== Religious crisis and international touring ====
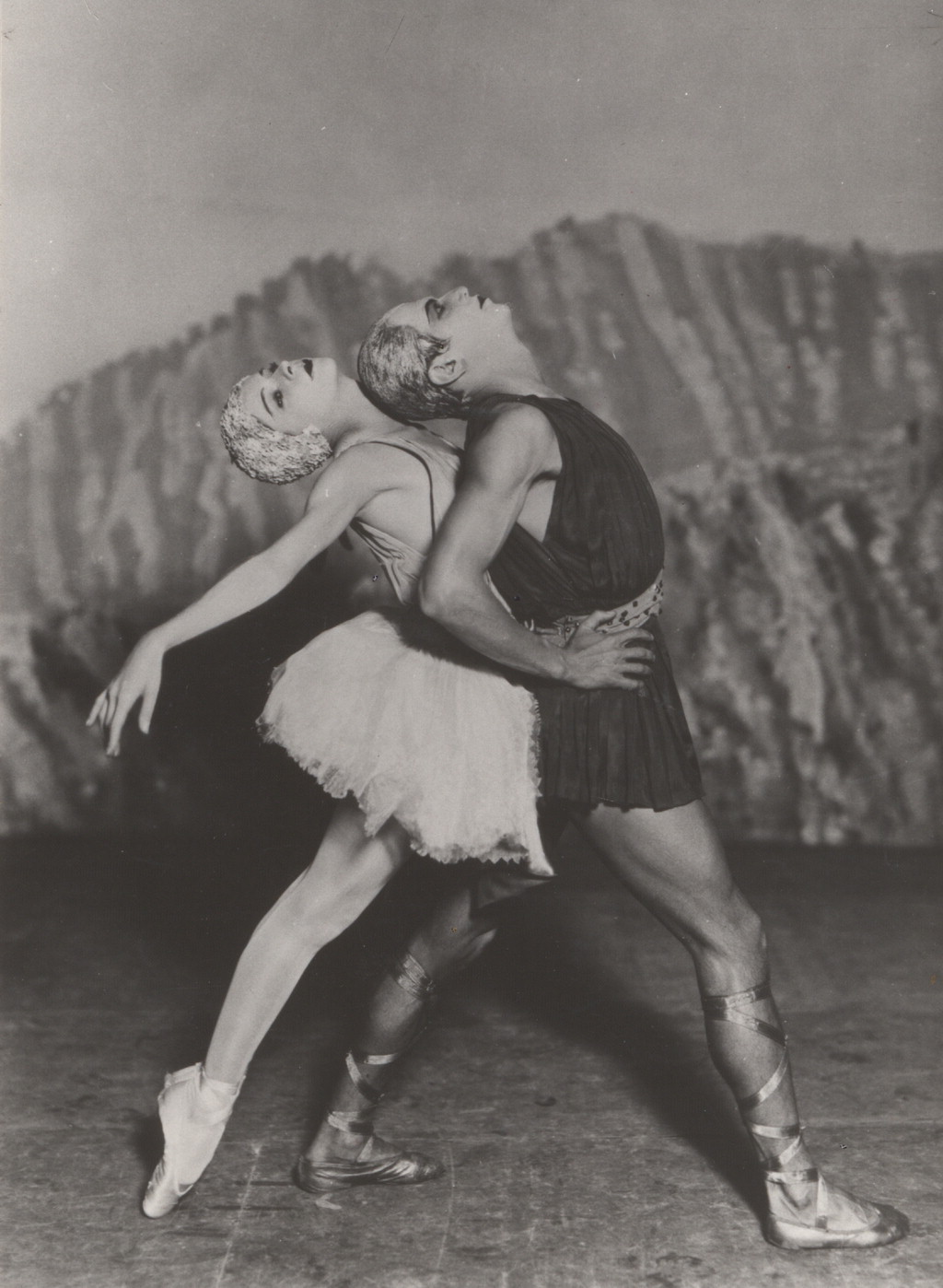
Alexandra Danilova and Serge Lifar in Apollon musagète

The Stravinsky family moved again in September 1924, this time to Nice. Stravinsky's schedule was divided between spending time with his family in Nice, performing in Paris, and touring other locations, often accompanied by Vera. At the time, he was going through a spiritual crisis onset by meeting Father Nicolas, a priest near his new home. Stravinsky had abandoned the Russian Orthodox Church during his teenage years, but after meeting Father Nicolas in 1926 and reconnecting with his faith, he began regularly attending services. From then until moving to the United States, (Note: Stravinsky's religious affiliation after moving to the United States is difficult to determine; in 1953, Life magazine reported that Stravinsky "is fairly regular in his attendance at Los Angeles's Russian Orthodox Church", but he refuted this point in the margins of his copy.) Stravinsky diligently attended church, participated in charity work, and studied religious texts. He later wrote that he was contacted by God at a service at the Basilica of Saint Anthony of Padua, leading him to write his first religious composition, the Pater Noster for a cappella choir.

In 1925, Stravinsky asked French writer and artist Jean Cocteau to write the libretto for an operatic setting of Sophocles's tragedy Oedipus Rex in Latin. The May 1927 premiere of Stravinsky's opera-oratorio Oedipus rex was staged as a concert performance since there was too little time and money to present it as a full opera, and Stravinsky attributed the work's critical failure to its programming between two glittery ballets. Furthermore, the influence from Russian Orthodox vocal music and 18th-century composers like Handel was not well received in the press after the May 1927 premiere; neoclassicism was not popular with Parisian critics, and Stravinsky had to publicly assert that his music was not part of the movement. This reception from critics was not improved by Stravinsky's next ballet, Apollon musagète, which depicted the birth and apotheosis of Apollo using an 18th-century ballet de cour musical style. George Balanchine choreographed the premiere, beginning decades of collaborations between him and Stravinsky. Nevertheless, some critics found it a turning point in Stravinsky's neoclassical music, describing it as a pure work that blended neoclassical ideas with modern methods of composition.

A new commission for a ballet from Russian-born ballerina Ida Rubinstein in 1928 led Stravinsky again to Tchaikovsky. Basing the music on romantic ballets like Swan Lake and borrowing many themes from Tchaikovsky, Stravinsky wrote The Fairy's Kiss with Danish writer Hans Christian Andersen's tale The Ice-Maiden as the subject. The November 1928 premiere was not well-received, likely due to the disconnect between each of the ballet's sections and the mediocre choreography, of which Stravinsky disapproved. Diaghilev's fury with Stravinsky for accepting a ballet commission from someone else caused an intense feud between the two, one that lasted until the former's death in August 1929. (Note: Stravinsky later looked back on their friendship with happiness, recalling in his autobiography, "He was genuinely attracted by what I was then writing, and it gave him real pleasure to produce my work ... These feelings of his, and the zeal which characterized them, naturally evoked in me a reciprocal sense of gratitude, deep attachment, and admiration for his sensitive comprehension, his ardent enthusiasm, and the indomitable fire with which he put things into practice.") Most of that year was spent composing a new solo piano work, the Capriccio, and touring across Europe to conduct and perform piano; the Capriccio's success after the December 1929 premiere caused a flurry of performance requests from many orchestras. A commission from the Boston Symphony Orchestra in 1930 for a symphonic work led Stravinsky back to Latin texts, this time from the book of Psalms. Between touring concerts, he composed the choral Symphony of Psalms, a deeply religious work that premiered in December of that year.

==== Work with Dushkin ====
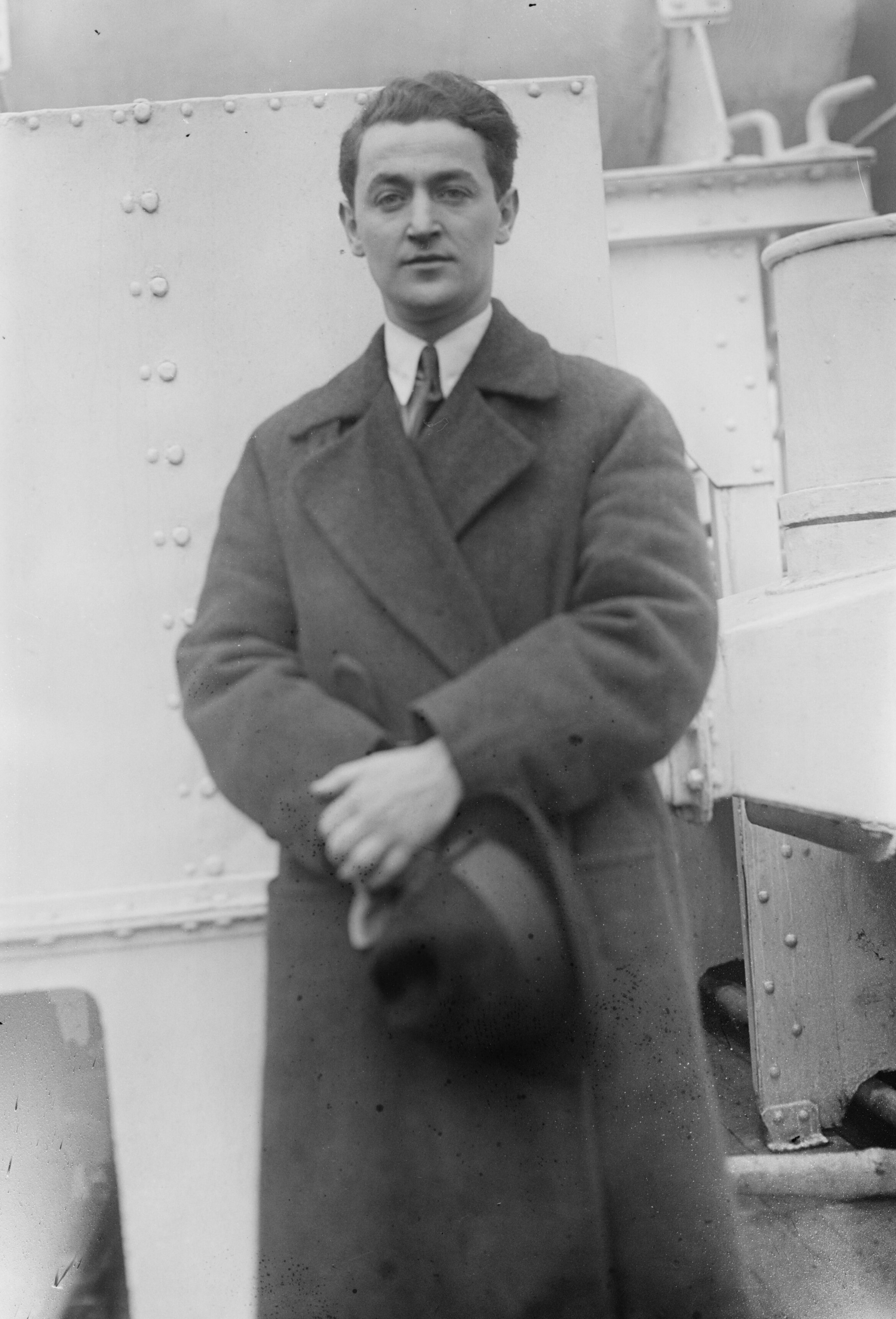
Samuel Dushkin, date unknown

While touring in Germany, Stravinsky visited his publisher's home and met Polish-American violinist Samuel Dushkin, who convinced him to compose the Violin Concerto with the latter's help on the solo part. Impressed by Dushkin's virtuosic ability and understanding of music, Stravinsky wrote more music for violin and piano, and rearranged some of his earlier music to be performed alongside the Concerto while on tour until 1933. That year, Stravinsky received another ballet commission from Rubenstein for a setting of a poem by French writer André Gide. The resulting melodrama Perséphone only received three performances in 1934 due to its lukewarm reception, and Stravinsky's disdain towards the work was evident in his later suggestion that the libretto be rewritten. In June of that year, Stravinsky became a naturalized French citizen, protecting all his future works under copyright in France and the United States. The Stravinsky family subsequently moved to an apartment on the Rue du Faubourg Saint-Honoré, where he began writing a two-volume autobiography with the help of Walter Nouvel, published in 1935 and 1936 as Chroniques de ma vie.

After the short run of Perséphone, Stravinsky embarked on a successful three-month tour of the United States with Dushkin; he visited South America for the first time the following year. Soulima was an excellent pianist, having performed the Capriccio in concert with Stravinsky conducting. Continuing a line of solo piano works, Stravinsky composed the Concerto for Two Pianos to be performed by them both, and they toured the work through 1936. Around this time came three American-commissioned works: the ballet Jeu de cartes for Balanchine, the Brandenburg Concerto-like work Dumbarton Oaks, and the lamenting Symphony in C for the Chicago Symphony Orchestra's 50th anniversary. Stravinsky's last years in France from late 1938 to 1939 were marked by the deaths of Ludmila, Yekaterina, and Anna, the former two from tuberculosis. In addition, the increasingly hostile criticism of his music in major publications (Note: A notable example was the June 1939 issue of La Revue musicale, which featured an article by ballet master Serge Lifar that began by praising Stravinsky's genius but turned to criticizing his music as unfit for dance and "positively anti-dance". Stravinsky's colleagues were agitated by Lifar's article, threatening to disallow publication of their material in La Revue musicale's issue, but nothing happened in order to prevent a scandal.) and failed run for a seat at the Institut de France further dissociated him from France, and shortly after the beginning of World War II in September 1939, he moved to the United States.

=== United States, 1939–1971 ===
==== Adjustment to the United States and commercial works ====
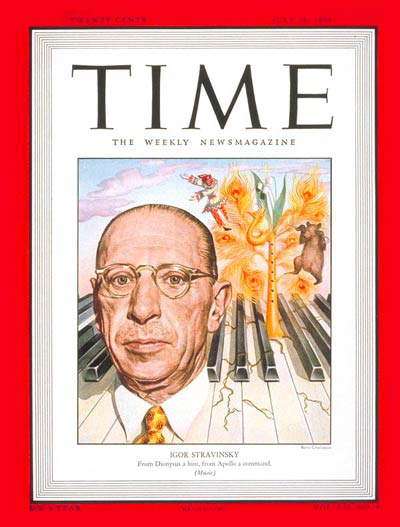
Stravinsky on the cover of Time magazine in 1948

Upon arriving in the United States, Stravinsky resided with Edward W. Forbes, the director of the Charles Eliot Norton Lectures series at Harvard University. Stravinsky was contracted to deliver six lectures for the series, beginning in October 1939 and ending in April 1940. The lectures, written with assistance from Pyotr Suvchinsky and Alexis Roland-Manuel, were published in French under the title Poétique musicale (Poetics of Music) in 1941, with an English translation following in 1947. Between lectures, Stravinsky finished the Symphony in C and toured across the country, meeting Vera upon her arrival in New York. Stravinsky and Vera married on 9 March 1940 in Bedford, Massachusetts. After the completion of his lecture series, the couple moved to Los Angeles, where they applied for American naturalization. There Stravinsky and his wife became close friends of the violinist and musicologist Sol Babitz, and became the godparents of Babitz's daughter, the writer and artist Eve Babitz.

Money became scarce as the war stopped Stravinsky from receiving European royalties, making him take up numerous conducting engagements and compose commercial works for the entertainment industry, including the Scherzo à la russe for Paul Whiteman and the Scènes de ballet for a Broadway revue. He allowed The Rite of Spring to be used in Walt Disney's 1940 animated feature Fantasia that featured a rearranged and shortened version of the piece by Leopold Stokowski. Some discarded film music made it into larger works, as with the war-inspired Symphony in Three Movements, the middle movement of which used music from an unused score for The Song of Bernadette (1943). The poor English of Stravinsky and Vera led to the formation of a predominantly European social circle and home life: the estate staff consisted of mostly Russians, and frequent guests included musicians Joseph Szigeti, Arthur Rubinstein, and Sergei Rachmaninoff. However, Stravinsky eventually joined popular Hollywood circles, attending parties with celebrities, and becoming closely acquainted with European authors Aldous Huxley, W. H. Auden, Christopher Isherwood, and Dylan Thomas.

In 1945, Stravinsky received American citizenship and subsequently signed a contract with British publishing house Boosey & Hawkes, who agreed to publish all his future works. Additionally, he revised many of his older works and had Boosey & Hawkes publish the new editions to re-copyright his older works. Around the 1948 premiere of another Balanchine collaboration, the ballet Orpheus, Stravinsky met young conductor Robert Craft in New York; Craft had asked Stravinsky to explain the revision of the Symphonies of Wind Instruments for an upcoming concert. The two quickly became friends, and Stravinsky invited Craft to Los Angeles; Craft soon became Stravinsky's assistant, collaborator, and amanuensis until the latter's death. (Note: Many believed that Craft manipulated Stravinsky in the latter's later years. Darius Milhaud, an old friend of Stravinsky's, later joked that "no one can get near [Stravinsky] these days"; Stravinsky's children believed that Craft used Vera to execute his wishes.) In 1942, Barnum and Bailey commissioned Balanchine to choreograph circus music for elephants. Balanchine asked Stravinsky to compose it. Stravinsky asked who the piece was for. "Elephants" Balanchine explained. "How old?" the composer inquired. "Young." "If they are very young, I will do it. " This was the origin of the Circus Polka.

==== Turn towards serialism ====
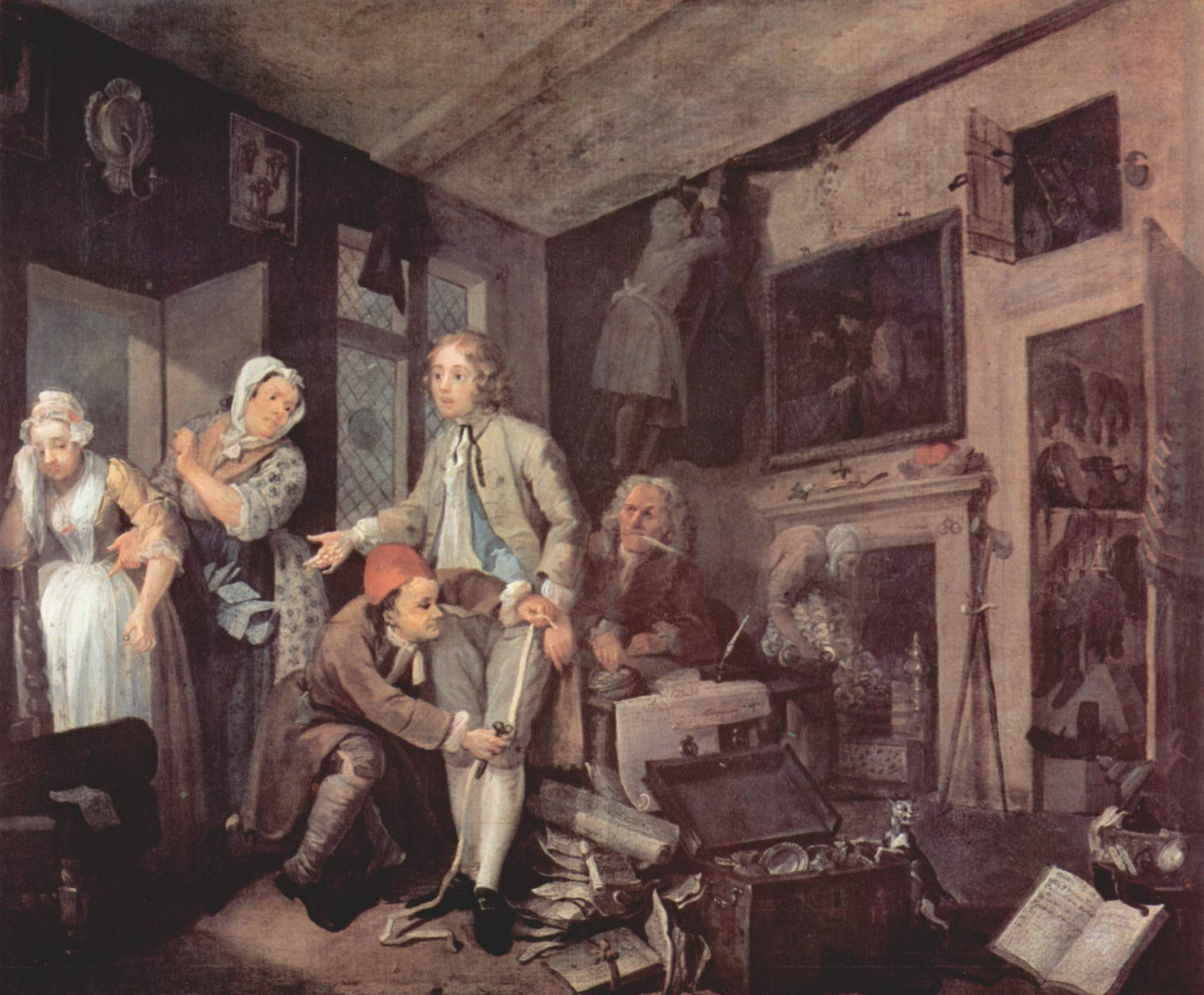
The first painting in the series The Rake's Progress, upon which Stravinsky based his opera of the same name

As he became more familiar with English, Stravinsky developed the idea to write an English-language opera based on William Hogarth's series of paintings The Rake's Progress. Stravinsky joined Auden to write the libretto in November 1947; American writer Chester Kallman was later brought in to assist Auden. Stravinsky finished the opera of the same name in 1951, and despite its widespread performances and success, he was dismayed to find that his newer music did not captivate young composers. Craft had introduced Stravinsky to the serial music of the Second Viennese School shortly after The Rake's Progress premiered, while the latter began studying and listening to the music of Anton Webern and Arnold Schoenberg.

During the 1950s, Stravinsky continued touring extensively across the world, occasionally returning to Los Angeles to compose. In 1953, he agreed to compose a new opera with a libretto by Dylan Thomas, but development on the project came to a sudden end following the latter's death in November of that year. Stravinsky completed In Memoriam Dylan Thomas, his first work fully based on the serial twelve-tone technique, the following year. The 1956 cantata Canticum Sacrum premiered at the International Festival of Contemporary Music in Venice, inspiring Norddeutscher Rundfunk to commission the musical setting Threni in 1957. With the Balanchine ballet Agon, Stravinsky fused neoclassical themes with the twelve-tone technique, and Threni showed his full shift towards use of tone rows. In 1959, Craft interviewed Stravinsky for an article titled Answers to 35 Questions, in which the latter sought to correct myths surrounding him and discuss his relationships with other artists. The article was later expanded into a book, and over the next four years, three more interview-style books were published. (Note: Craft's heavy editing on these volumes, combined with Stravinsky's weak memory of early-life events, made the books unreliable and factually inaccurate.)

Continued international tours brought Stravinsky to Washington, D.C., in January 1962, and he attended a dinner at the White House with then-President John F. Kennedy in honor of the former's 80th birthday. Although it was largely an anti-Soviet political stunt, Stravinsky remembered the event fondly, composing the Elegy for J.F.K. after Kennedy's assassination a year later. In September 1962, Stravinsky returned to Russia for the first time since 1914, accepting an invitation from the Union of Soviet Composers to conduct six performances in Moscow and Leningrad (Saint Petersburg). After the success of The Firebird and The Rite of Spring in the 1910s, his music was respected and frequently performed in the Soviet Union, influencing young Soviet composers at the time like Shostakovich. However, after Stalin began consolidating power in the early 1930s, Stravinsky's music nearly vanished and was formally banned in 1948. A new interest in Stravinsky works was born during the Khrushchev Thaw, partly due to his three-week visit in 1962, during which he met with Soviet premier Nikita Khrushchev and several leading Soviet composers, including Shostakovich and Khachaturian. After eight months of almost continual traveling, Stravinsky returned to Los Angeles in December 1962.

==== Final works and death ====
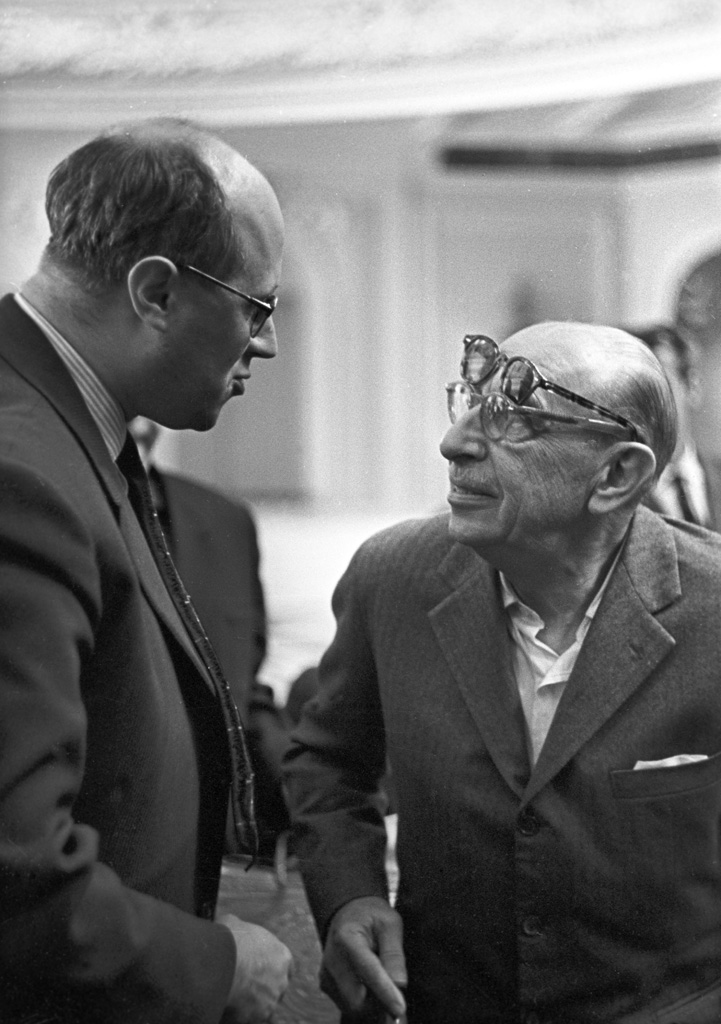
Stravinsky (right) with Mstislav Rostropovich (Note: When Russian cellist and conductor Mstislav Rostropovich met Stravinsky in 1961 in London and the following year in Moscow, the former asked Craft about a commission for cello from the latter. Craft replied that it would be expensive, so Rostropovich settled for arrangements. Performances and a recording of the Pas de deux from The Fairy's Kiss and of the Russian Maiden's Song from Mavra followed. Rostropovich usually played from memory, but the music's constantly shifting rhythms made him sketch it out on paper and place it on the piano.) in September 1962

Stravinsky revisited biblical themes for many of his later works, notably in the 1961 chamber cantata A Sermon, a Narrative and a Prayer, the 1962 musical television production The Flood, the 1963 Hebrew cantata Abraham and Isaac, and the 1966 Requiem Canticles, the last of which was his final major composition. (Note: While the Requiem Canticles was Stravinsky's final major work, The Owl and the Pussy Cat, a song for soprano and piano, was his last composition. He also left a number of unfinished works, as well as incomplete transcriptions of Bach and Wolf works.) Between tours, he worked relentlessly to devise new tone rows, even working on toilet paper from airplane lavatories. The intense touring schedule began taking a toll on Stravinsky; January 1967 marked his last recording session, and his final concert came the following May. An obviously very frail Stravinsky made his final public conducting appearance on 17 May 1967 at Massey Hall when he led the Toronto Symphony Orchestra in a performance of his Pulcinella Suite.

After spending the autumn of 1967 in the hospital due to bleeding stomach ulcers and thrombosis, Stravinsky returned to domestic touring in 1968 (only appearing as an audience member) but stopped composing due to his gradual decline in physical health.

In his final years, Stravinsky moved to New York with Vera and Craft to be closer to medical care, and the former's travel was limited to visiting family in Europe. Stravinsky was discharged from Lenox Hill Hospital after contracting pulmonary edema. He subsequently moved with Vera to a new apartment on Fifth Avenue, where he died on 6 April 1971 at the age of 88. A funeral service was held three days later at the Frank E. Campbell Funeral Chapel. After a service at Santi Giovanni e Paolo in Venice with a performance of the Requiem Canticles conducted by Craft, Stravinsky was buried on the cemetery island of San Michele, several meters from Diaghilev's tomb.

== Music ==
Excerpt from The Firebird (1910)
"Infernal Dance"
United States Marine Band, arrangement by Thomas Knox

Much of Stravinsky's music is characterized by short, sharp articulations with minimal rubato or vibrato. His student works were primarily assignments from Rimsky-Korsakov and were mainly influenced by Russian composers. Stravinsky's first three ballets, The Firebird, Petrushka, and The Rite of Spring, marked the beginning of his international fame and a departure from 19th-century styles. Stravinsky's music is often divided into three periods of composition: his Russian period (1913–1920), where he was greatly influenced by Russian artists and folklore; his neoclassical period (1920–1951), where he turned towards techniques and themes from the classical period; and his serial period (1954–1968), where he used highly structured composition techniques pioneered by composers of the Second Viennese School.

=== Student works, 1898–1907 ===
Stravinsky's time before meeting Diaghilev was spent learning from Rimsky-Korsakov and his collaborators. Only three works survive from before Stravinsky met Rimsky-Korsakov in August 1902: "Tarantella" (1898), Scherzo in G minor (1902), and The Storm Cloud, the first two being works for piano, and the last being works for voice and piano. Stravinsky's first assignment from Rimsky-Korsakov was the four-movement Piano Sonata in F♯ minor, which was also his first work to be performed in public. Rimsky-Korsakov often gave Stravinsky the task of orchestrating various works to allow him to analyze the works' form and structure. Many of Stravinsky's early works showed influence from French composers as well, notably in the minimal use of large doublings and different combinations of tone colors. A number of Stravinsky's student compositions were performed at Rimsky-Korsakov's gatherings at his home; these include a set of bagatelles, a "chanson comique", and a cantata, showing the use of classical musical techniques that would later define Stravinsky's neoclassical period. Rimsky-Korsakov thought that the Symphony in E♭ (1907) was swayed too much by Glazunov's style, and disliked the modernist influence on Faun and Shepherdess (1907); however, critics found the works to not stand out from Rimsky-Korsakov's music. Musicologist Stephen Walsh described this time in Stravinsky's musical career as "aesthetically cramped" due to the "cynical conservatism" of Rimsky-Korsakov and his music.

=== First three ballets, 1910–1913 ===
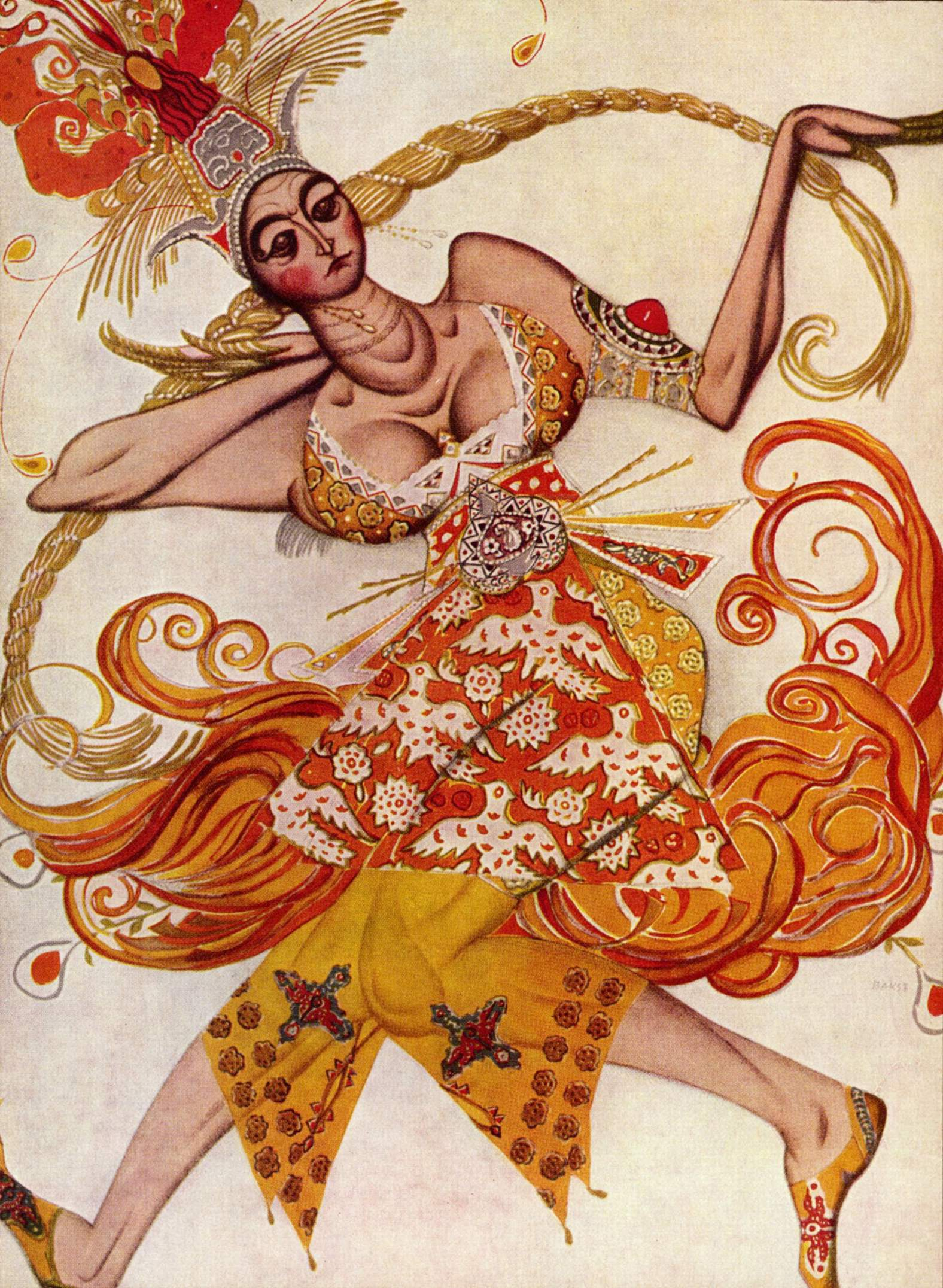
Sketch of costumes for The Firebird by Léon Bakst, 1910

Russian composers often used large orchestration to feature many different timbres, and Stravinsky harnessed this idea in his first three ballets, often surprising the musicians and performers due to the orchestra's great force at certain moments. The Firebird used a harmonic structure that Stravinsky called "leit-harmony", a portmanteau of leitmotif and harmony used by Rimsky-Korsakov in his opera The Golden Cockerel. The "leit-harmony" was used to juxtapose the protagonist, the Firebird, and the antagonist, Koschei the Deathless: the former was associated with whole-tone phrases, and the latter was associated with octatonic harmony. Stravinsky later wrote how he composed The Firebird in a state of "revolt against Rimsky", and that he "tried to surpass him with ponticello, col legno, flautando, glissando, and fluttertongue effects".

Stravinsky defined his musical character in his second ballet, Petrushka. The Russian influence can be seen in the use of a number of Russian folk tunes in addition to two waltzes by Viennese composer Joseph Lanner and a French music hall tune. (Note: See: "Table I: Folk and Popular Tunes in Petrushka" Taruskin (1996, pp. I: 696–697).) Stravinsky also used a folk tune from Rimsky-Korsakov's opera The Snow Maiden, showing the former's continued reverence for the latter. Petrushka also contained one of the first prominent uses of bitonality in modern music, through use of the recurring "Petrushka chord".

Stravinsky's third ballet, The Rite of Spring, caused a near-riot at the premiere due to its avant-garde nature. He had begun to experiment with polytonality in The Firebird and Petrushka, but for The Rite of Spring, he "pushed [it] to its logical conclusion," as Eric Walter White described it. In addition, the complex meter in the music consists of phrases combining conflicting time signatures and odd accents, such as the "jagged slashes" in the "Sacrificial Dance". Both polytonality and unusual rhythms can be heard in the chords that open the second episode, "Augurs of Spring", consisting of an E♭ dominant 7 superimposed on an F♭ major triad written in an uneven rhythm, Stravinsky shifting the accents seemingly at random to create asymmetry. The Rite of Spring is one of the most famous and influential works of the 20th century; musicologist Donald Jay Grout described it as having "the effect of an explosion that so scattered the elements of musical language that they could never again be put together as before."

=== Russian period, 1913–1920 ===
Excerpt from Renard (1916), showing the constant meter changes prevalent in much of Stravinsky's Russian period music

Musicologist Jeremy Noble said that Stravinsky's "intensive researches into Russian folk material" took place during his time in Switzerland from 1914 to 1920. Béla Bartók considered Stravinsky's Russian period to have begun in 1913 with The Rite of Spring due to its use of Russian folk songs, themes, and techniques. The use of duple or triple meters was especially prevalent in Stravinsky's Russian period music; while the pulse may have remained constant, the time signature would often change to constantly shift the accents.

While Stravinsky did not use as many folk melodies as he had in his first three ballets, he often used folk poetry. The ballet-cantata Les noces was based on texts from a collection of Russian folk poetry by Pyotr Kireevsky, and his opera-ballet Renard was based on a folktale collected by Alexander Afanasyev. Many of Stravinsky's Russian period works featured animal characters and themes, likely due to inspiration from nursery rhymes that he read with his children. Stravinsky also used unique theatrical styles. Les noces blended the staging of ballets with the small instrumentation of early cantatas, a unique production described on the score as "Russian Choreographic Scenes". In Renard, the voices were placed in the orchestra, as they were meant to accompany the action on stage. L'Histoire du soldat was composed in 1918 with Swiss novelist Charles F. Ramuz as a small musical theatre production for dancers, a narrator, and a septet. It mixed the Russian folktales in the narrative with common musical structures of the time, like the tango, waltz, rag, and chorale. Even as his style changed in later years, Stravinsky maintained a musical connection to his Russian roots.

=== Neoclassical period, 1920–1951 ===
The ballet Pulcinella was commissioned by Diaghilev in 1919 after he proposed the idea of a ballet based on music by 18th-century Italian composers like Pergolesi; by imposing a work based on the harmonic and rhythmic systems of late-Baroque era composers, Stravinsky marked the start of his turn towards 18th-century music. Although Noble considered Stravinsky's neoclassical period to have begun in 1920 with his Symphonies of Wind Instruments, Bartók argued that the period "really starts with his Octet for Wind Instruments, followed by his Concerto for Piano". During this period, Stravinsky used techniques and themes from the classical period of music.

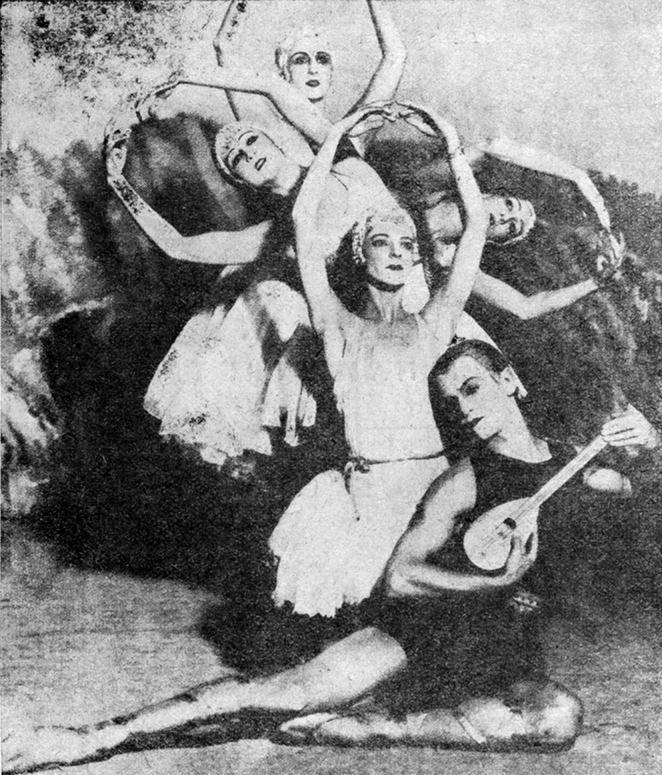
Dancers in the Ballets Russes's Apollon musagète

Greek mythology was a common theme in Stravinsky's neoclassical works. His first Greek mythology-based work was the ballet Apollon musagète (1927), choosing the leader of the Muses and the god of art, Apollo, as the subjects. Stravinsky would use themes from Greek mythology in future works like Oedipus rex (1927), Persephone (1935), and Orpheus (1947). Musicologist Richard Taruskin wrote that Oedipus rex was "the product of Stravinsky's neo-classical manner at its most extreme" and that musical techniques "thought outdated" were juxtaposed against contemporary ideas. In addition, Stravinsky turned towards older musical structures and modernized them. His Octet (1923) uses the sonata form, modernizing it by disregarding the standard ordering of themes and traditional tonal relationships for different sections. Baroque counterpoint was used throughout the choral Symphony of Psalms (1930). In the jazz-influenced Ebony Concerto (1945), Stravinsky fused big band orchestration with Baroque forms and harmonies.

Stravinsky's neoclassical period ended in 1951 with the opera The Rake's Progress. Taruskin described the opera as "the hub and essence of 'neo-classicism'". He pointed out how the opera contains numerous references to Greek mythology and other operas like Mozart's Don Giovanni and Bizet's Carmen but still "embod[ies] the distinctive structure of a fairy tale". Stravinsky was inspired by the operas of Mozart in composing the music, particularly Così fan tutte, (Note: Stravinsky and Auden attended a performance of Così fan tutte while they wrote the libretto, and the former later cited Mozart's opera as an influence on The Rake's Progress.) but other scholars also point out influence from Handel, Gluck, Beethoven, Schubert, Weber, Rossini, Donizetti, and Verdi. The Rake's Progress has become an important work in opera repertoire, being "[more performed] than any other opera written after the death of Puccini", according to Taruskin.

=== Serial period, 1954–1968 ===
In the 1950s, Stravinsky began using serial compositional techniques, such as the twelve-tone technique originally devised by Schoenberg. Noble wrote that this time was "the most profound change in Stravinsky's musical vocabulary", partly due to the latter's newfound interest in the music of the Second Viennese School after meeting Craft. Stravinsky's treatment of the twelve-tone technique was unique: whereas Schoenberg's technique was very strict, disallowing repetitions of a tone row until it was complete, Stravinsky repeated notes freely, even separating the row into cells and reordering the notes. In addition, the orchestration style of Stravinsky's serial period became dark and bass-heavy, with winds and piano frequently using their lowest registers.

Five-tone row from In Memoriam Dylan Thomas (1954)

Stravinsky first experimented with non-twelve-tone serial techniques in small-scale works such as the Cantata (1952), the Septet (1953) and Three Songs from Shakespeare (1953). The first of his compositions fully based on such techniques was In Memoriam Dylan Thomas (1954). Agon (1954–1957) was the first of his works to include a twelve-tone series, whereas the second movement from Canticum Sacrum (1956) was the first piece to contain a movement entirely based on a tone row. Agon's unique tonal structure was significant to Stravinsky's serial music; it begins diatonic, moves towards full 12-tone serialism in the middle, and returns to diatonicism in the end. Stravinsky returned to sacred themes in works such as Canticum Sacrum, Threni (1958), A Sermon, a Narrative and a Prayer (1961), and The Flood (1962). Stravinsky used a number of concepts from earlier works in his serial pieces; for example, the voice of God being two bass voices in homophony seen in The Flood was previously used in Les noces. Stravinsky's final large-scale work, the Requiem Canticles (1966), made use of a complex four-part array of tone rows throughout, showing the evolution of Stravinsky's serialist music. Noble described the Requiem Canticles as "a distillation both of the liturgical text and of his own musical means of setting it, evolved and refined through a career of more than 60 years".

The influence of other composers on Stravinsky can be seen throughout this period. He was heavily influenced by Schoenberg, not only in his use of the twelve-tone technique, but also in the distinctly "Schoenbergian" instrumentation of the Septet and the similarities between Schoenberg's Klangfarbenmelodie and Stravinsky's Variations. Stravinsky also used a number of themes found in works by Britten, later commenting about the "many titles and subjects [I have shared] with Mr. Britten already". In addition, Stravinsky was very familiar with the works of Anton Webern, being one of the figures who inspired Stravinsky to consider serialism a possible form of composition.

== Artistic influences ==
Stravinsky worked with some of the most famous artists of his time, many of whom he met after achieving international success with The Firebird. Diaghilev was one of Stravinsky's most prominent artistic influences, having introduced him to composing for the stage and bringing him international fame with his first three ballets. Through the Ballets Russes and Diaghilev, Stravinsky worked with figures like Vaslav Nijinsky, Léonide Massine, Alexandre Benois, Michel Fokine, and Léon Bakst.

Stravinsky as drawn by Pablo Picasso in 1920

Stravinsky's interest in art propelled him to develop a strong relationship with Picasso, whom he met in 1917. In the years following, the two engaged in an artistic dialogue in which they exchanged small-scale works of art to each other as a sign of intimacy, which included the famous portrait of Stravinsky by Picasso, and a short sketch of clarinet music by Stravinsky. This exchange was essential to establish how the artists would approach their collaborative space in Ragtime and Pulcinella.

Stravinsky displayed a taste in literature that was wide and reflected his constant desire for new discoveries. The texts and literary sources for his work began with interest in Russian folklore. After moving to Switzerland in 1914, Stravinsky began gathering folk stories from numerous collections, which were later used in works like Les noces, Renard, Pribaoutki, and various songs. Many of Stravinsky's works, including The Firebird, Renard, and L'Histoire du soldat were inspired by Afanasyev's collection Russian Folk Tales. Collections of folk music influenced Stravinsky's music; numerous melodies from The Rite of Spring were found in an anthology of Lithuanian folk songs.

An interest in the Latin liturgy began shortly after Stravinsky rejoined the church in 1926, beginning with the composition of his first religious work in 1926 Pater Noster, written in Old Church Slavonic. He later used three psalms from the Latin Vulgate in his Symphony of Psalms for orchestra and mixed choir. Many works in Stravinsky's neoclassical and serial periods used (or were based on) liturgical texts.

Stravinsky worked with many writers throughout his career. Stravinsky first worked with Ramuz, with whom he formed the idea and wrote the text, on L'Histoire du soldat in 1918. In 1933, Russian-born ballerina Ida Rubinstein commissioned Stravinsky to set music to a poem by French writer André Gide, later becoming the melodrama Perséphone. The Stravinsky-Gide collaboration was apparently tense: Gide disliked how the music did not follow the prosody of his poem and did not attend rehearsals, and Stravinsky ignored many of the former's ideas. Gide later left the project and did not attend the premiere run. The story of The Rake's Progress was first conceived by Stravinsky and W. H. Auden, the latter of whom wrote the libretto with Chester Kallman. Stravinsky befriended many other writers as well, including T. S. Eliot, Aldous Huxley, Christopher Isherwood, and Dylan Thomas; Stravinsky began working with Thomas on an opera in 1953 but the project was abandoned after the latter's death.

== Legacy ==
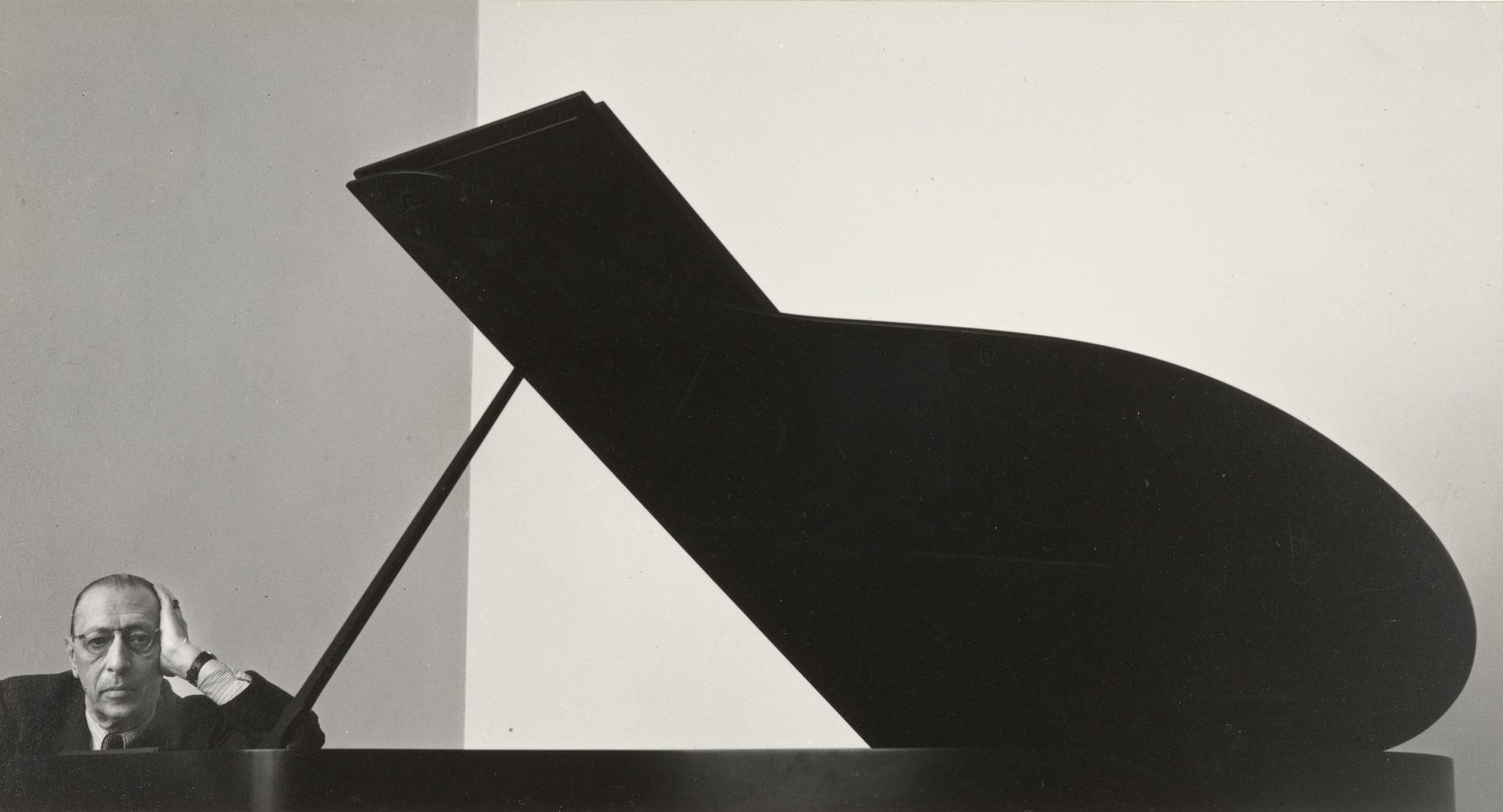
Photograph of Stravinsky by Arnold Newman

Stravinsky is widely regarded as one of the greatest composers of the 20th century. In 1998, Time magazine listed him as one of the 100 most influential people of the century. Stravinsky was not only recognized for his composing; he also achieved fame as a pianist and as a conductor. American composer Philip Glass wrote in Time, "He conducted with an energy and vividness that completely conveyed his every musical intention. Here was Stravinsky, a musical revolutionary whose own evolution never stopped. There is not a composer who lived during his time or is alive today who was not touched, and sometimes transformed, by his work." Stravinsky was also renowned for his precise orchestration: French critic Alexis Roland-Manuel wrote that Stravinsky and French composer Maurice Ravel were the "[two men] in the world who best knows the weight of a trombone-note, the harmonics of a 'cello or a pp tam-tam in the relationships of one orchestral group to another."

Stravinsky was noted for his distinctive use of rhythm, especially in The Rite of Spring. The rhythm in The Rite stretched across bars and lacked distinct beats, which opened the door for future composers to make rhythm more fluid within meters. However, many saw his subsequent neoclassical period as a return to the past while other composers tried advancing modern music. Stravinsky's subsequent turn towards serialism further alienated him from audiences, and academics saw this stylistic shift as not innovative enough because they believed that Schoenberg's death also marked the end of twelve-tone music. Walsh related the changing nature of Stravinsky's music to the latter's nature: as an exile from his native Russia, Stravinsky adapted to his environment and absorbed the music of those around him. Martha Hyde stated that more recent analysis "judg[ed] Stravinsky's neoclassical style as the harbinger of musical postmodernism". After his death, Stravinsky's importance in modernist music became evident: though many modern styles quickly fell out of fashion (like twelve-tone music), his music stood out as a body of unique ingenuity, according to Walsh. (Note: This significance was evident when parts of The Rite of Spring were included on the Voyager Golden Records.)

Stravinsky influenced many composers and musicians. His music continues to offer inspiration and a unique method to young composers. The rhythmic innovations in The Rite of Spring brought rhythm to the forefront of modern music rather than tonality, setting a new standard in the modernist movement that future composers like Varèse and Ligeti were inspired to innovate upon. Stravinsky's rhythm and vitality greatly influenced Aaron Copland and Pierre Boulez, and the combination of folklore and modernism found in many of Stravinsky's works influenced Bartók as well. Stravinsky's less popular works were also widely influential: the disconnected form of the Symphonies of Wind Instruments can be seen similarly in later works by avant-garde masters like Messiaen, Tippett, Andriessen, and Xenakis. Stravinsky also influenced composers like Elliott Carter, Harrison Birtwistle, and John Tavener. Aside from Craft, his students include Earnest Andersson, Armando José Fernandes, Mordecai Seter, Robert Strassburg, and Warren Zevon.

== Recordings ==
Stravinsky's need for money during the World Wars led him to sign many contracts with record companies to conduct his music. Stravinsky's early exposure to player piano technology guided his view that records were far inferior to live performance but acted as historical documentation of how his works should be performed. As a result, Stravinsky left a massive archive of recordings of his own music, seldom recording music by other composers. Although most of his recordings were made with studio musicians, he also worked with the Chicago Symphony Orchestra, the Cleveland Orchestra, the CBC Symphony Orchestra, the New York Philharmonic, the Royal Philharmonic Orchestra, and the Bavarian Radio Symphony Orchestra. Stravinsky received five Grammy Awards and a total of eleven nominations for his recordings, with three of his albums being inducted into the Grammy Hall of Fame. He was posthumously awarded the Grammy Lifetime Achievement Award in 1987.

During his lifetime, Stravinsky appeared on several telecasts and documentaries. The first, A Conversation with Igor Stravinsky, was released in 1957 by NBC and produced by Robert Graff, who later commissioned and produced The Flood. The interview-like format later influenced the various volumes that Craft wrote with Stravinsky. The 1965 National Film Board of Canada documentary Stravinsky, directed by Roman Kroitor and Wolf Koenig, followed Stravinsky conducting the CBC Symphony Orchestra in a recording of the Symphony of Psalms, with anecdotal interviews interspersed throughout. The 1966 CBS documentary Portrait of Stravinsky took Stravinsky back to the Théâtre des Champs-Élysées (where The Rite of Spring premiered) and to his old home in Clarens, Switzerland. Other documentaries captured the collaborative process between Balanchine and Stravinsky.

== Writings ==
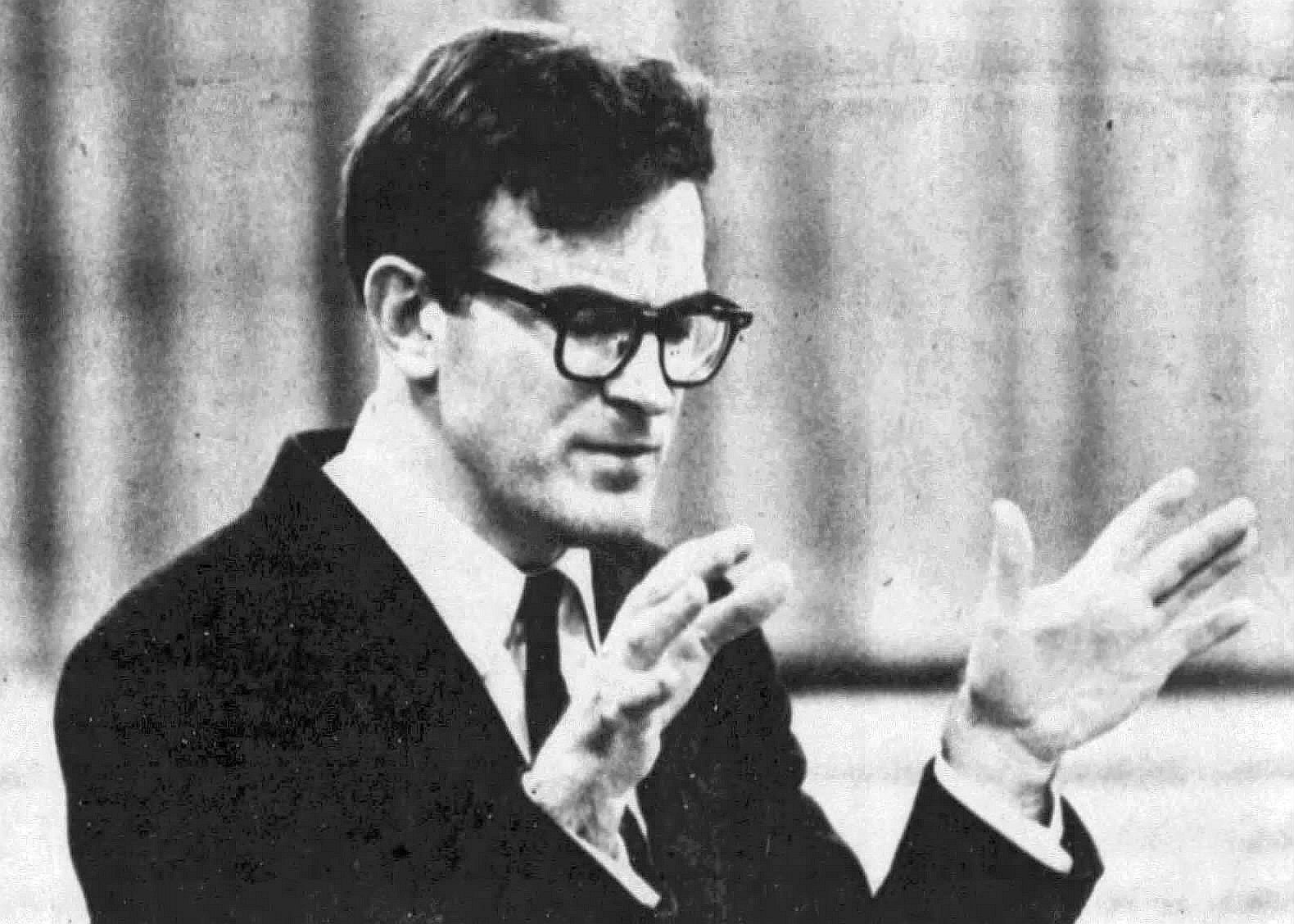
Robert Craft in 1967; he dictated and edited six memoirs with Stravinsky in the latter's later years

Stravinsky published a number of books throughout his career. In his 1936 autobiography, Chronicle of My Life, which was written with the help of Walter Nouvel, he included his well-known statement that "music is, by its very nature, essentially powerless to express anything at all". With Alexis Roland-Manuel and Pierre Souvtchinsky, he wrote his 1939–40 Harvard University Charles Eliot Norton Lectures, which were delivered in French and first collected under the title Poétique musicale in 1942 and then translated in 1947 as Poetics of Music. (Note: The names of uncredited collaborators are given in Walsh 2001.) In 1959, several interviews between Stravinsky and Craft were published as Conversations with Igor Stravinsky. Five more volumes of a similar format were published over the following decade.

Books and articles are listed in Appendix E of Eric Walter White's Stravinsky: The Composer and His Works, references in Alicja Jarzębska's Stravinsky: His Thoughts and Music, and Walsh's profile of Stravinsky on Oxford Music Online.

=== Books ===
- Stravinsky, Igor (1936). Chronicle of My Life. London: Gollancz. OCLC 1354065. Originally published in French as Chroniques de ma vie, 2 vols. (Paris: Denoël et Steele, 1935), subsequently translated (anonymously) as Chronicle of My Life. This edition reprinted as Igor Stravinsky – An Autobiography, with a preface by Eric Walter White (London: Calder and Boyars, 1975) ISBN 978-0-7145-1063-7. Reprinted again as An Autobiography (1903–1934) (London: Boyars, 1990) ISBN 978-0-7145-1063-7. Also published as Igor Stravinsky – An Autobiography (New York: M. & J. Steuer, 1958), and An Autobiography (New York: W. W. Norton, 1962) ISBN 978-0-393-00161-7.
- — (1970) [1947]. Poetics of Music in the Form of Six Lessons: The Charles Eliot Norton Lectures for 1939–1940. Translated by Seferis, George A.; Knodel, Arthur. Harvard University Press. ISBN 978-0-674-67856-9.
- —; Craft, Robert (1959). Conversations with Igor Stravinsky. Doubleday. OCLC 896750. Reprinted by University of California Press, 1980. ISBN 978-0-520-04040-3.
- —; — (1981) [1960]. Memories and Commentaries. Doubleday. ISBN 978-0-520-04402-9. Reprinted by University of California Press, 1981. (Note: The 2002 reprinted "One-Volume Edition" varies from the 1960 original, London: Faber and Faber. ISBN 978-0-571-21242-2.)
- —; — (1981) [1962]. Expositions and Developments. Faber and Faber. ISBN 978-0-520-04403-6. Reprinted by University of California Press, 1981.
- —; — (1963). Dialogues and a Diary. Doubleday. OCLC 896750. Reprinted by Faber and Faber, 1986. (Note: The 1968 reprinted Dialogues varies from the 1963 original, London: Faber and Faber. ISBN 0-571-10043-0.)
- —; — (1966). Themes and Episodes. Alfred A. Knopf. OCLC 611277.
- —; — (1969). Retrospectives and Conclusions. Alfred A. Knopf. OCLC 896809.
- —; — (1972). Themes and Conclusions. Faber and Faber. This is a one-volume edition of Themes and Episodes (1966) and Retrospectives and Conclusions (1969) as revised by Igor Stravinsky in 1971. ISBN 978-0-571-08308-4. Reprinted by University of California Press, 1982.

=== Articles ===
- Stravinsky, Igor (29 May 1913). Canudo, Ricciotto (ed.). "Ce que j'ai voulu exprimer dans 'Le sacre du printemps'" [What I Wanted to Express in The Rite of Spring]. Montjoie! (in French). No. 2. At DICTECO
- — (15 May 1921). "Les Espagnols aux Ballets Russes" [The Spaniards at the Ballets Russes]. Comœdia (in French). At DICTECO
- — (18 October 1921). "The Genius of Tchaikovsky". The Times (Open Letter to Letter to Diaghilev). No. 42854. London.
- — (18 May 1922). "Une lettre de Stravinsky sur Tchaikovsky" [A Letter from Stravinsky on Tchaikovsky]. Le Figaro (in French). At DICTECO
- — (January 1924). "Some Ideas about my Octuor". The Arts. Vol. VI, no. 1. Brooklyn. (in White 1979, pp. 575–577)
- — (1924). "O mych ostatnich utworach" [About my last works]. The Muzyka (in Polish). No. 1. pp. 15–17.
- — (1927). "Kilka uwag o tzw. neoklasycyzmie" [A few remarks about so-called neoclassicism]. The Muzyka (in Polish). No. 12. pp. 563–566.
- — (December 1927). "Avertissement... a Warning". The Dominant. London: Oxford University Press. (in White 1979, p. 577)
- — (29 April 1934). "Igor Strawinsky nous parle de 'Perséphone'" [Igor Stravinsky tells us about Persephone]. Excelsior (in French). At DICTECO
- — (1934). "Moja spowiedź muzyczna" [My Musical Confession]. The Muzyka (in Polish). No. 2. pp. 56–57.
- — (15 December 1935). "Quelques confidences sur la musique" [Some secrets about music]. Conferencia (in French). Paris. At DICTECO
- — (28 January 1936). "Ma candidature à l'Institut" [My application to the Institute]. Jour (in French). Paris.
- — (1940). Pushkin: Poetry and Music. OCLC 1175989080.
- —; Nouvel, Walter (1953). "The Diaghilev I Knew". The Atlantic Monthly. pp. 33–36.
