= Scherzo fantastique =

1908 orchestral work by Igor Stravinsky

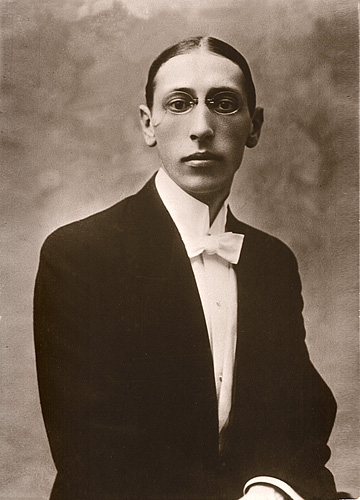
Igor Stravinsky c. 1905

Scherzo fantastique, op. 3, composed in 1908, is the second purely orchestral work by Igor Stravinsky (preceded by the Symphony in E♭ op.1). Despite the composer's later description of the work as "a piece of 'pure', symphonic music", the work was inspired by Maurice Maeterlinck's 1901 essay "La Vie des Abeilles" (The Life of Bees), as is made clear in a letter of 18 June 1907 from the composer to his teacher Rimsky-Korsakov. Ten years later, Léo Staats adapted it as a ballet for the Opéra Garnier, with the title Les Abeilles, which was objected to by Maeterlinck.

== History ==
In July 1907, Stravinsky wrote to Nikolai Rimsky-Korsakov that he planned a "fantastic scherzo", to be called Bees. He started work on it in the same month and completed it on 30 March 1908. Rimsky-Korsakov saw the score and liked it, but he died in 1908 and never heard the work performed. Stravinsky dedicated the work to Alexander Siloti, who conducted the first performance on 6 February 1909 at the Siloti Concerts in St Petersburg. Stravinsky's Feu d'artifice (Fireworks) received its first performance at the same concert. Sergei Diaghilev was present and was impressed by this music, leading him to offer Stravinsky the first of his commissions for ballet music. The score was first published around 1909 by the Russian sheet music publisher P. Jurgenson.

Stravinsky later claimed that he conceived the Scherzo Fantastique as abstract music. On 10 January 1917 it was performed as a ballet blanc at the Paris Opera House, with choreography by Léo Staats to a scenario based on Maeterlink's essay "La Vie des Abeilles" (the life of [the] bees). Stravinsky had not authorised this performance, and Maeterlinck objected to it.

== Instrumentation ==
Scherzo fantastique is scored for piccolo, 3 flutes (2nd doubling alto flute, 3rd doubling 2nd piccolo), 2 oboes, cor anglais, 3 clarinets in A (3rd doubling clarinet in D), bass clarinet in A, 2 bassoons, contrabassoon, 4 horns, 2 trumpets in A, contralto trumpet in F, cymbals, celesta, 3 harps and strings. Stravinsky reduced the number of harps to 2 in 1930.

== Musical style ==
Like other early works of Stravinsky, the Scherzo fantastique follows the 19th-century Russian taste for exoticism. It uses octatonic and whole-tone scales, augmented triads and diminished seventh chords, and more chromaticism than in the composer's earlier works. The rhythm still uses fixed time signatures, and phrases are predominantly four bars long. It avoids rubato, using perpetuum mobile to maintain forward momentum.

Influences on the work acknowledged by Stravinsky were: Rimsky-Korsakov ("Flight of the Bumblebee"), Mendelssohn (via Tchaikovsky), Dukas (The Sorcerer's Apprentice), Wagner and Debussy.

== Form ==
The work comprises a single movement that plays for between 11m 40s and 16 minutes. A note on the flyleaf of the score, contemptuously dismissed by Stravinsky as a sales blurb, reads:

This piece is inspired by an episode in the life of the bees. The first section gives an impression of life and activity in the hive. The central section, a slow movement, depicts sunrise and the nuptial flight of the queen bee. The love flight with her chosen mate, and his death. The third section, a reprise of the first, shows the peaceful activity of the hive continuing. Thus the whole piece becomes for us human beings the fantastic picture of an eternal cycle.

== Discography ==
- Stravinsky's 1 December 1962 recording with the CBC Symphony Orchestra is included in Sony Classical's 22-CD set of the composer's works.
- Gerard Schwarz conducted the Seattle Symphony Orchestra in 1988 on Delos Productions DE 3054 release of Petrouchka.
