= Capriccio for Piano and Orchestra =

Musical composition by Igor Stravinsky

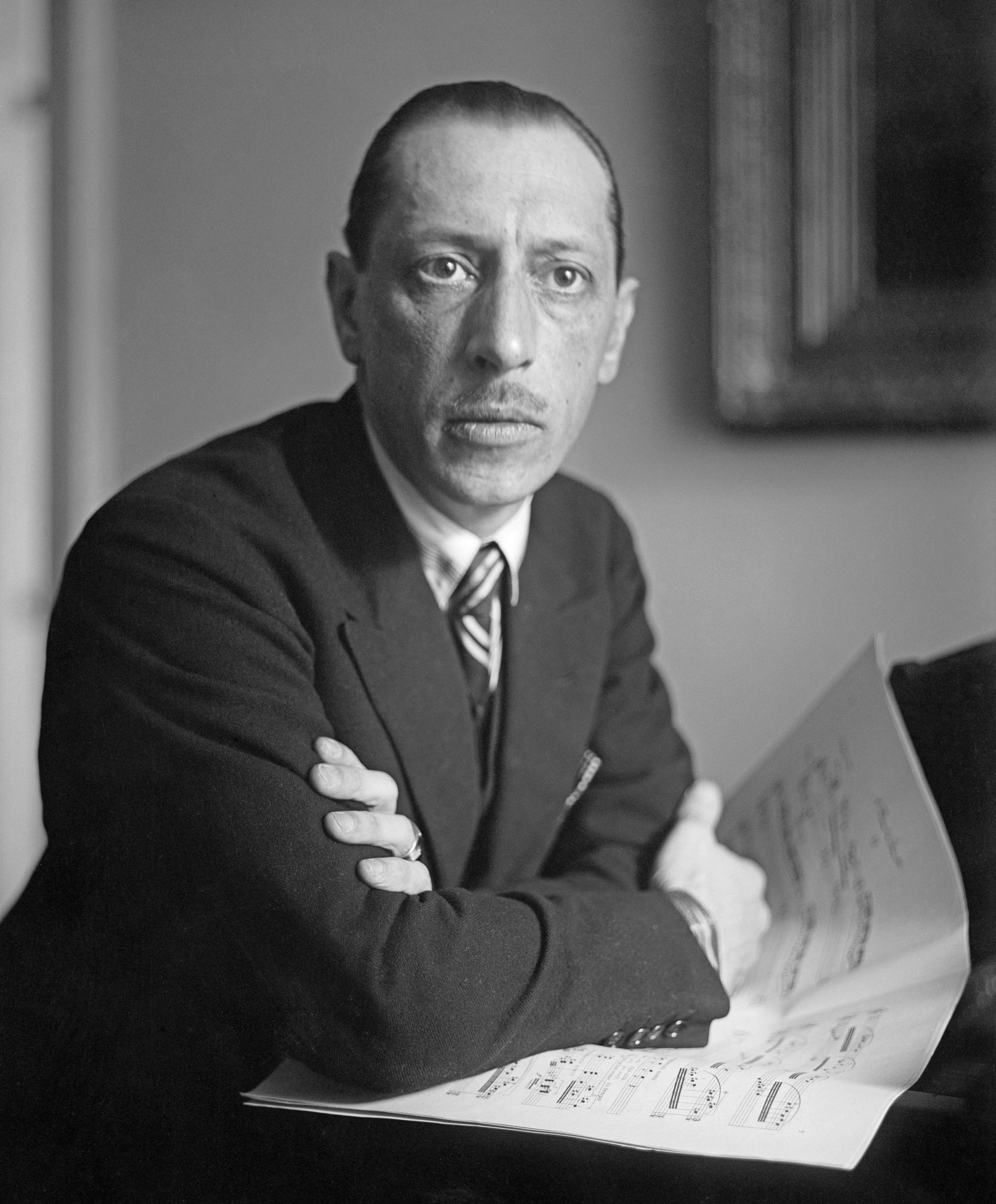
Igor Stravinsky in the 1920s

The Capriccio for Piano and Orchestra was written by Igor Stravinsky in Nice between 1926 and 1929. The score was revised in 1949.

Stravinsky designed the Capriccio to be a virtuosic vehicle which would allow him to earn a living from playing the piano part. The Capriccio, together with the Concerto for Piano and Wind Instruments, belonged to a catalogue of breadwinning pieces which Stravinsky composed to support himself after fleeing the Russian Revolution to live in Western Europe.

== History ==
The Allegro capriccioso movement that would become the finale was begun first, in Nice on Christmas Day 1928, and provided the musical material from which the other movements grew. It was followed by the second movement, completed at Echarvines, near Talloires, on 13 September 1929, and then by the opening Presto. The orchestration of the first movement was completed on 26 October and that of the last movement on 9 November 1929.

The premiere took place in the Salle Pleyel, Paris, on 6 December 1929, with the Orchestre symphonique de Paris conducted by Ernest Ansermet (who had founded the orchestra that winter season) and featuring the composer at the piano. The next year, Stravinsky made a commercial recording of the work as soloist, with the Straram Orchestra, conducted by Ernest Ansermet. Beginning in the mind-1930s, Stravinsky's son Soulima often performed it as soloist, most often with his father conducting.

In 1949 Stravinsky corrected a number of misprints and omissions in the score, and this version was published in 1952. Unfortunately, a few new mistakes were added in this new edition, the most important of which was a change of the tempo marking at rehearsal number 14 from the original dotted-quaver = 88 to 80, which contradicts the specification that the semiquavers remain the same.

Amongst other influences on the Capriccio, Stravinsky very much had in mind Carl Maria von Weber, whom he described as "a prince of music".

The three movements are played attacca (without interruption) and take just under twenty minutes to perform.

1. Presto
2. Andante rapsodico
3. Allegro capriccioso ma tempo giusto

== Instrumentation ==
The Capriccio is scored for solo piano, pairs of woodwinds (flutes doubling piccolo, oboes, clarinets doubling piccolo clarinet, and bassoons), cor anglais, four horns, three trombones, tuba, strings and timpani.

In addition to the solo piano, there is a concertino group of soloists consisting of the first violinist, first violist, first cellist and first bassist.

== Ballet productions ==
The score was first used as ballet music when Léonide Massine choreographed it in 1947 for the Teatro alla Scala, Milan. The décor for this production was by Nicola Benois. A second production was created in 1957 with choreography, décor, and costumes by Alan Carter.

The original 1929 version of the Capriccio was used by George Balanchine as the score for the "Rubies" section of his full-length 1967 ballet Jewels.

== Bibliography ==
=== References ===
- Anon. (n.d.). "Jewels" (ballet; online production history and program notes). New York City Ballet.
- Blackmur, Richard Palmer (1904–1965) (January 1931). "Necromancy – Embodying a Review of the Strawinsky Capriccio". Phonograph Monthly Review. Vol. 5, no. 4. pp. 121–122 – via Internet Archive (National Recording Preservation Board). LCCN unk84135656; OCLC 11380159 (all editions), OCLC 1762297 (all editions) & 499264168.
- Columbia. Capriccio for Piano and Orchestra (three 12" shellac discs; 78 rpm; recorded May 8, 9, and 10, 1930 an). Stravinsky (piano), Straram Orchestra (Paris), Ernest Ansermet (conductor). Release 21535456 at Discogs.
1. Presto. Audio via YouTube Columbia (France) LFX81 | (U.K.) LX116 | (U.S.) 67870D | mx WLX 1352, WLX 1353.
2. Andante rapsodico. Audio via YouTube Columbia (France) LFX82 | (U.K.) LX117 | (U.S.) 67871D | mx WLX 1356, WLX 1357.
3. Allegro capriccioso, ma tempo giusto. Audio via YouTube Columbia (France) LFX83 | (U.K.) LX118 | (U.S.) 67872D | mx WLX 1359, WLX 1360.
- "Stravinsky (1882–1971): A Composers' Memorial". Perspectives of New Music. 9 (2) (Spring–Summer 1971) & 10 (1) (Autumn–Winter): 15–27. ISSN 0031-6016 (publication); JSTOR 832141 (article); OCLC 6733363955, 6733244113 (article).
1. Johnston, Ben. "An Interview With Soulima Stravinsky". pp. 15–27.
2. Fortner, Wolfgang. [Untitled]. pp. 29–31.
3. Hamilton, David. "Igor Stravinsky: A Discography of the Composer's Performances". pp. 163–179.
- Stravinsky (1982). Craft, Robert (ed.). Stravinsky, Selected Correspondence. Vol. 1. New York: Alfred A. Knopf. p. 210 (footnote 259) – via Internet Archive (Kahle/Austin Foundation). LCCN 81-47495; ISBN 0-3945-1870-5; OCLC 7775631 (all editions).
- White, Eric Walter (1905–1985) (1966). Stravinsky: The Composer and His Works. University of California Press.
1. 1st ed.. 1966 – via Internet Archive (Arcadia Fund). LCCN 66-27667; LCCN 67-75435.
2. 2nd ed.. 1979 – via Google Books (limited preview). LCCN 80-110579; ISBN 0-5200-3985-8.
