= Canticum Sacrum =

Choral-orchestral piece composed by Igor Stravinsky

- Sacred choral music
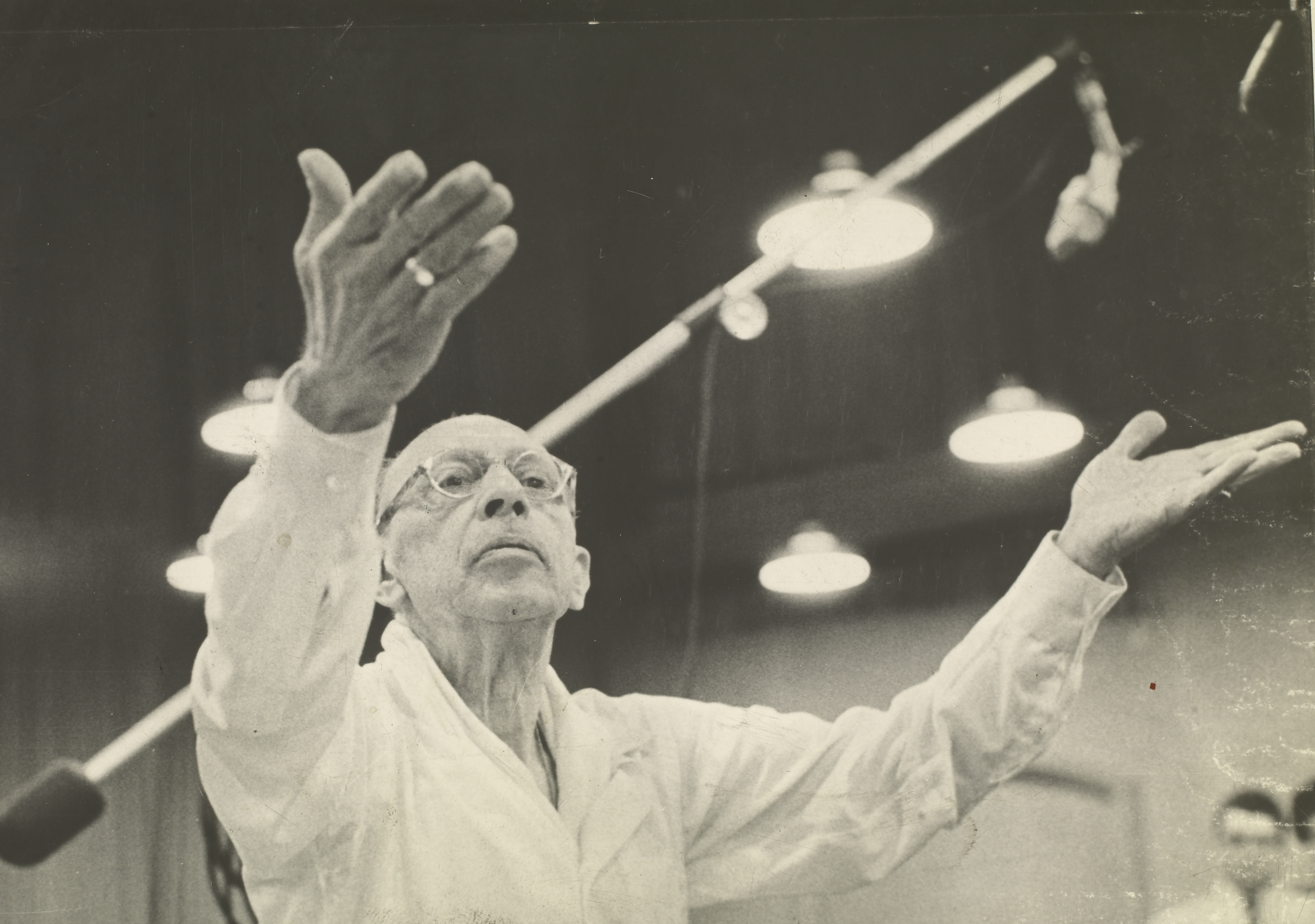
- Stravinsky in 1962
- Text: biblical
- Language: Latin
- Performed: 13 September 1956: St Mark's Basilica, Venice
- Duration: 17 min
- Movements: five
- Scoring: tenor and baritone soloists; mixed choir; orchestra

Canticum Sacrum ad Honorem Sancti Marci Nominis is a 17-minute choral-orchestral piece composed in 1955 by Igor Stravinsky (1882–1971) in tribute "To the City of Venice, in praise of its Patron Saint, the Blessed Mark, Apostle." The piece is compact and stylistically varied, ranging from established neoclassical modes to experimental new techniques. The second movement, "Surge, Aquilo", was Stravinsky's first movement based entirely on a tone row.

Though most often abbreviated "Canticum Sacrum", the piece's full name is Canticum Sacrum ad honorem Sancti Marci Nominis, or Canticle to Honor the Name of Saint Mark.

== Text ==
Stravinsky selected all of his texts except the opening dedication from the Latin Vulgate. They are presented here in an English translation:

- Dedicato: "To the City of Venice, in praise of its Patron Saint, the Blessed Mark, Apostle"
- Part I, Euntes in mundum: "Go into the world, and preach the Gospel to every creature" (Mark 16:15)
- Part II, Surge, aquilo: "Awake, O north wind; and come, thou south; blow upon my garden, that the spices thereof may flow out. Let my beloved come into his garden, and eat his pleasant fruits. I am come into my garden, my sister, my spouse: I have gathered my myrrh with my spice; I have eaten my honeycomb with my honey; I have drunk my wine with my milk: eat, O friends; drink, yea, drink abundantly, O beloved. (Song of Songs 4:16, 5:1)
- Part III, Ad Tres Virtutes Hortationes
  - Caritas: "And thou shalt love the Lord your God with all your heart, and with all your soul, and with all your might." (Deuteronomy 6:5) / "Beloved, let us love one another: for love is of God; and every one that loves is born of God, and knows God." (1 John 4:7)
  - Spes: "They that trust in the Lord shall be as mount Zion" / "I waited patiently for the Lord" (Psalms 125:1, 130:5–6)
  - Fides: "I believed, therefore have I spoken: I was greatly afflicted." (Psalms 116:10)
- Part IV, Brevis Motus Cantilenae: "Jesus said to him, If you can, all things are possible to him that believes. And straightway the father of the child cried out, and said with tears, 'Lord, I believe; help my unbelief!'" (Mark 9:23–24)
- Part V, Illi autem profecti: "And they went forth, and preached everywhere, the Lord working with them, and confirming the word with signs following. Amen." (Mark 16:20)

== Orchestration ==
Canticum Sacrum is scored for tenor and baritone soloists, mixed chorus, and an orchestra of 1 flute (which plays only in the second movement), 2 oboes, cor anglais, 2 bassoons, contrabassoon, 3 trumpets in C, bass trumpet in C, 2 tenor trombones, bass trombone, contrabass trombone, organ, harp, violas, and double basses. Clarinets, horns, violins, and cellos are all absent.

Canticum Sacrum is Stravinsky's only piece to make use of the organ. Its use represents one of many tributes to the traditions of Saint Mark's Basilica.

== Structure ==
Canticum Sacrum is in five movements (or sections, since they are all attacca), plus an introductory dedication (which is set apart textually, structurally and stylistically, from the rest of the piece). The work is cyclical and chiastic: the fifth movement is an almost exact retrograde of the first. Movements two and four are also related through their use of solo voice, and the central third movement (by far the longest) has an internal ABA structure. The movements' lengths are 36, 48, 156, 57, and 39 bars respectively (movement five adds three bars to the retrograde for a final amen). The construction is sophisticated, exhibiting symmetry, proportion, and balance. Movement 3 relates to movements 1 and 5 through their common use of recurring organ versets, and relates to movements 2 and 4 by their common use of dodecaphony.

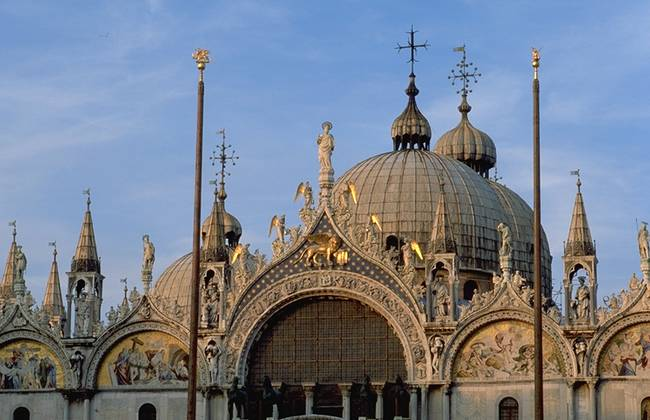
Saint Mark's Basilica in the evening

Some critics have suggested that the Canticum Sacrum bears a strong structural relationship to that of the basilica, the five principal sections of Stravinsky's piece relating directly to the five domes of Saint Mark's. Both the central dome of the church, and the central movement of Canticum Sacrum, are the largest and most structurally imposing. Furthermore, it is in this movement which Stravinsky chooses to depict the three Christian virtues (Faith, Hope, and Charity) perhaps corresponding to the central dome of Saint Mark's, which depicts the virtues surrounding Christ. Similar comparisons, structural and textual can be made for each of the movements. For example, not only are movements 1 and 5 both quotations from Saint Mark's Gospel, thus attaching the work firmly to its patron saint and the church, but they also echo the themes of domes one and five which portray the prophets, and the disciples, respectively.

== History ==
Stravinsky had long had a special relationship with the city of Venice and the prestigious Venice Biennale. In 1925, he performed his Piano Sonata at the ISCM World Music Days there, and in 1934 conducted his Capriccio with his son as soloist, as parts of the Venice Biennale. Stravinsky is even interred in Venice on the island of San Michele, as is the man who brought him to international fame with the 1910 commission of L'Oiseau de feu, Sergei Diaghilev.

Stravinsky lacked direct experience with the acoustics of Saint Mark's.

== Reception ==
Stravinsky himself conducted the first performance which occurred in Saint Mark's Cathedral in Venice on September 13, 1956. He was 74.

Time magazine titled its review "Murder in the Cathedral", though this barb may have been directed at the performance rather than the composition itself.

To Stravinsky, the epoch that saw the dawn of European polyphony was much nearer to the essential truth—unadorned, harsh even—than the sophisticated response of a declining society's disillusioned minds. "He was stimulated by the early polyphonists' straightforward approach, hardly hampered by harmonic implications, as they were; for the emotionally conditioned harmonic style, which was evident, to a varying degree, in his earlier music, had no longer any attraction for him".

== See also ==
- Igor Stravinsky
- St. Mark's Basilica
- Neoclassicism
- Serialism
- Robert Craft
- Venetian School (music)
