= A Sermon, a Narrative and a Prayer =

Vocal composition with an instrumental accompaniment

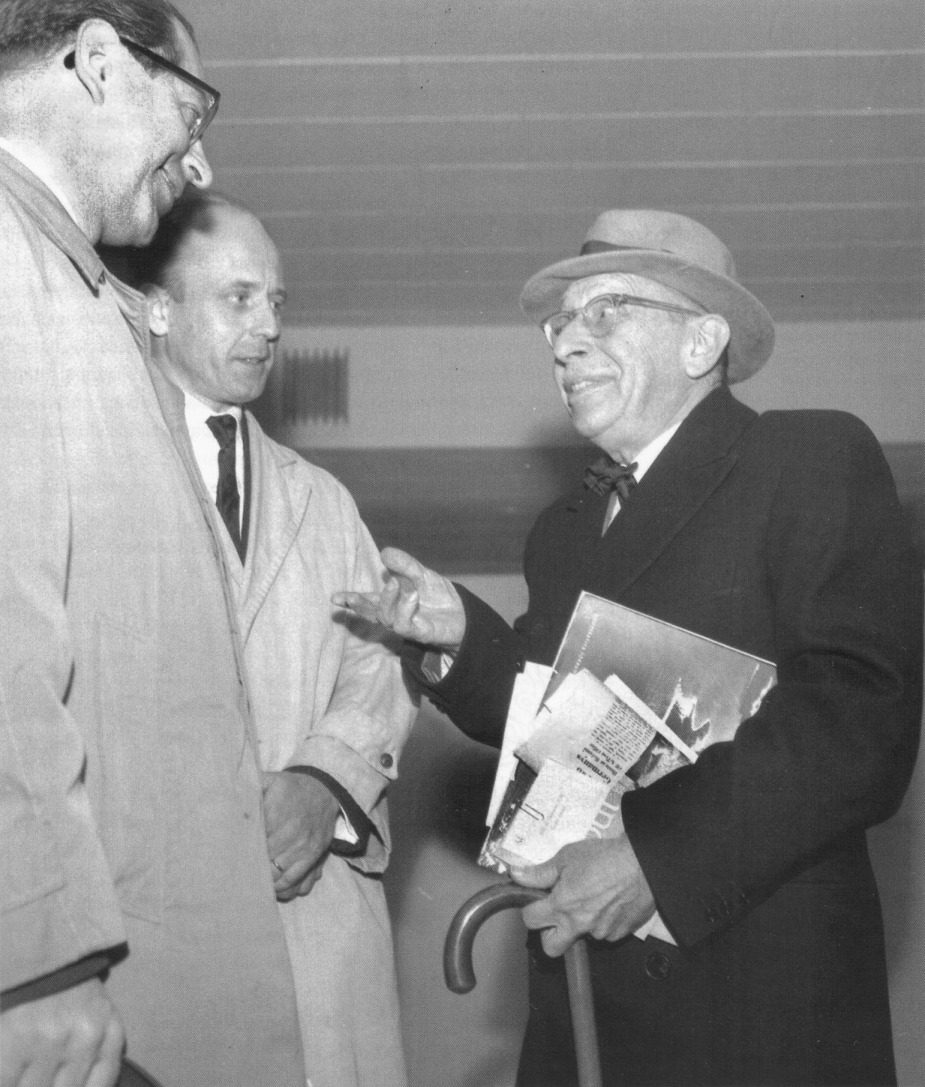
Stravinsky (right) with Kai Maasalo Kai Maasalo (middle), Helsinki, Finland, 1961

A Sermon, a Narrative and a Prayer is a cantata for alto and tenor singers, a narrator, chorus, and orchestra by Igor Stravinsky, composed in 1960–61. It belongs to the composer’s serial period, and lasts a little over a quarter of an hour in performance.

== History ==
Stravinsky began work on A Sermon, a Narrative and a Prayer in Hollywood in 1960, and finished it on 31 January 1961. The score is dedicated to the Swiss conductor Paul Sacher, who commissioned it—the third movement bears an additional dedication: "In memoriam the Reverend James McLane (†1960)". It was published later in the same year, and the work's first performance was given by the Basler Kammerorchester, conducted by the dedicatee, on 23 February 1962 in Basel.

== Analysis ==
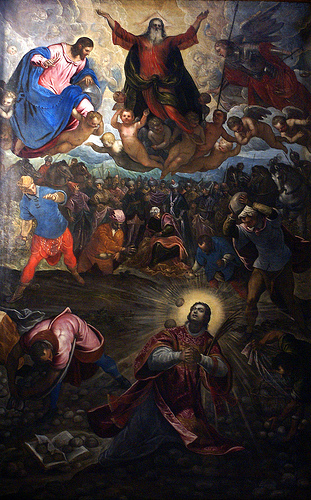
Stoning of St Stephen by Jacopo & Domenico Tintoretto, altarpiece of San Giorgio Maggiore, Venice

According to a note sent by the composer to Paul Sacher on 7 August 1961, Stravinsky regarded this cantata as a New-Testament counterpart to Threni, composed three years earlier to an Old-Testament text, the Lamentations of Jeremiah. For his text, Stravinsky chose passages from the Pauline epistles and the Acts of the Apostles, as well as a prayer by the Elizabethan poet Thomas Dekker, written in a style of English contemporary with that of the translations from the King James Version used for the Biblical passages. The full titles of the cantata’s three movements are:

1. A Sermon (from St. Paul)
2. A Narrative: The Stoning of St. Stephen (from the "Acts")
3. A Prayer (from Thomas Dekkar [sic])

The full orchestra never sounds together anywhere in the work, and the chorus is silent throughout the second movement.

=== Sermon ===
The opening Sermon is divided into eight sections, in an A B C D A E C D pattern. The basic series used in the work is presented melodically in section A, an instrumental prelude opening the first movement: E♭–E–C–D–D♭–B♭–B–F♯–G–A–A♭–F The first five notes of this row are a permuted form of the five-note row Stravinsky used for In Memoriam Dylan Thomas—a chromatic pentachord consisting of the notes bounded by a major third, and this pentachord occurs twice more in the row in the overlapping segment of notes 3–7, and in notes 8–12.

This is followed immediately by the first choral section, B, a rather obscure and difficult passage of intricate serial construction, mostly accompanied by the four horns. Over the concluding chord in the horns, a short solo for the tenor leads to section C, spoken by the choir to an accompaniment of tremolo sul ponticello strings, playing simultaneously the retrograde and retrograde inversion of the basic series. These same two forms of the series, transposed a semitone higher, recur in section D, now one after the other in a passage of two-part counterpoint between chorus and orchestra. The second half of the movement shadows the first, beginning with a modified retrograde of the instrumental introduction. This is followed by section E, another choral section that develops further the canonic and serial techniques used in the corresponding section B from the first half. Once again, the four horns sustain the concluding chord while the solo tenor and a bass from the choir sing a single complete melodic statement of the basic twelve-tone series, repeating the last line of the previous section's text: "then do we with patience wait for it." The last two sections are a literal repetition, including the text, of sections C and D from the first half.

=== Narrative ===
The second movement is an elaborate scena for the narrator (making his first appearance in the work) and soloists, accompanied by the orchestra, describing the trial and stoning of St Stephen. Canonic passages continue to be featured, now introducing first the oboes and bassoons in double canon, and then the piano and tuba in a three-part canon. The movement concludes with an eight-bar instrumental coda in which all four basic forms of the row are combined in a series of somber chords.

=== Prayer ===
Throughout the cantata, Stravinsky employs a method of hexachordal rotation, which he learned from the works of his friend Ernst Krenek, to generate arrays of pitches. Outside of these arrays, Stravinsky uses only the untransposed forms of the prime, retrograde, inverse, and inverse-retrograde forms of his series. The arrays are constructed by taking progressive rotations of each hexachord and then transposing the result so that each six-note set begins with the same note. For example, the first hexachord of the inverse form of the row has an interval succession of 11–4–10–1–3 semitones, plus an interval 7, wrapping around from the last back to the first note. By moving the first note in each hexachord to the end and then transposing the result to begin on E♭, the rotation scheme produces:

First-hexachord array from the inverse form of the series
	1	2	3	4	5	6
I	E♭	D	G♭	E	F	A♭
II	E♭	G	F	G♭	A	E
III	E♭	D♭	D	F	C	B
IV	E♭	E	G	D	D♭	F
V	E♭	G♭	D♭	C	E	D
VI	E♭	B♭	A	D♭	B	C

Stravinsky then in many cases would travel systematically through the array to derive long melodic lines, as he does with this array to produce the canonic passage in the alto and tenor voices on the words "Oh My God, if it Bee Thy pleasure to cut me off before night", in bars 226–238 near the beginning of the third movement (Prayer). This passage is a strict, "direct" rhythmic canon, but the hexachords are displaced, the tenor leading with hexachords II–II–IV–V–VI and the alto following, but with hexachords I–II–II–IV–V, and the pitches within corresponding hexachords are in retrograde order. This type of procedure suggests the canons used by Olivier Messiaen and Pierre Boulez, rather than the procedures of earlier composers such as Josquin des Prez and Johann Sebastian Bach, which provided the models for canons in many of Stravinsky’s other works.

At the end of this canon, the chorus enters with the four forms of the basic series. Double basses, piano, harp, and gongs, continue their ostinato from the opening canonic section, based on the first hexachord of the inversion. The two soloists in unison introduce the final choral Alleluia, alternating with passages in the strings, once again combining the four forms of the series, only now with the first hexachord of each retrograded.

== Footnotes ==
=== Sources ===
- Mason, Colin. 1961. "Stravinsky's New Work". Tempo, New Series, no. 59 (Autumn): 5–14.
- Straus, Joseph N. 2001. Stravinsky's Late Music. Cambridge Studies in Music Theory and Analysis 16. Cambridge University Press. pp. 11–18. ISBN 9780521602884.
- Van den Toorn, Pieter C. 1983. "The Music of Igor Stravinsky". Composers of the Twentieth Century. New Haven: Yale University Press. ISBN 9780300026931 (cloth); ISBN 9780300038842 (pbk).
- Watkins, Glenn. 1986. "The Canon and Stravinsky's Late Style". In Confronting Stravinsky, edited by Jann Pasler, 217–246. Berkeley and Los Angeles: University of California Press. ISBN 0-520-05403-2.
- White, Eric Walter. 1979. Stravinsky: The Composer and His Works, second edition. Berkeley and Los Angeles: The University of California Press. ISBN 0-520-03985-8.
