= Renard (Stravinsky) =

1916 chamber opera-ballet

- Comic opera by Igor Stravinsky
- Stravinsky, drawn by Picasso in 1920
- Native title: Ба́йка про лису́, петуха́, кота́, да барана́
- Librettist: Stravinsky
- Based on: Russian folk tale

Renard: histoire burlesque chantée et jouée, or The Fox: burlesque tale sung and played, is a chamber opera-ballet for four male voices and sixteen instrumentalists written in 1916 by Igor Stravinsky. Originally written in Russian, the text is derived from a folk tale collected by Alexander Afanasyev. Nameless, it had been generically titled Байка про лису, петуха, кота да барана, which can be translated to Tale of the Fox, the Cock, the Cat and the Ram. Its premier took place in Paris as a French translation on the 18 May 1922.

== History ==
In April 1915, Winnaretta Singer, Princesse Edmond de Polignac, commissioned Stravinsky to write a piece that could be played in her salon. She paid the composer 2,500 Swiss francs. The work was completed in Morges, Switzerland in 1916, and Stravinsky himself made a staging plan, trying to avoid any resemblance to conventional operatic staging. He created, rather, a new form of theatre in which the acrobatic dance is connected with singing, and the declamation comments on the musical action. However, the piece was never performed in the salon of the princess. It was not in fact staged until 1922.

The premiere, performed in a double bill with Tchaikovsky's The Sleeping Beauty, was given on 18 May 1922 by the Ballets Russes at the Théâtre de l’Opéra, Paris. It was conducted by Ernest Ansermet with choreography by Bronislava Nijinska, who also danced the title role, and decorations and costumes by Mikhail Larionov. Stravinsky remained pleased with Nijinska's "acrobatic Renard, which coincided with my ideas... Renard was also a real Russian satire. The animals saluted very like the Russian Army (Orwell would have liked this), and there was always an underlying significance to their movements."

On 21 May 1929, at the Théâtre Sarah-Bernhardt in Paris, Sergei Diaghilev and the Ballets Russes presented a revised version of Renard with choreography by Serge Lifar. Stravinsky was not happy with the revival, saying, "[it] was ruined chiefly by some jugglers Diaghilev had borrowed from a circus." Stravinsky regretted Marc Chagall's refusal of a commission to do the sets.

== Synopsis ==
This is a moralizing story, a farmyard fairy tale about Reynard the Fox, who deceives the Cock, the Cat and the Goat; but in the end they catch and punish him. The Cock is twice tricked and captured by the Fox, only to be rescued each time by the Cat and the Goat. After the Cock's second rescue, the Cat and the Goat strangle the Fox, and the three friends dance and sing. It also contains a slight irony relating to religion and the church – to be invulnerable the Fox wears the black gown of the nun (nuns used the privilege of inviolability in Russia).

As in his later ballet Les noces, Stravinsky employs here the singers as part of the orchestra, and the vocal parts are not identified with specific characters.

== Details about the score ==
=== Publication ===
Geneva: A. Henn, 1917; London: J. & W. Chester, 1917; Vienna: Wiener Philharmonischer Verlag. 1917; (as Bajka: veseloe predstavlenie s peniem i muzykoj) Moscow: Muzyka, 1973.

Duration c. 15–20 minutes.

Dedication: "Très respectueusement dédié a Madame la Princesse Edmond de Polignac"

=== Scoring ===
Singers: 2 tenors, 2 basses

Ensemble: flute (doubling piccolo), oboe (doubling cor anglais), clarinet (doubling E♭ clarinet), bassoon, 2 horns, trumpet, percussion (timpani, triangle, tambourine with bells, tambourine without bells, cylindrical drum, cymbals, bass drum), cimbalom (or piano), 2 violins, viola, cello and double-bass.

=== Translations ===
The French translation by C. F. Ramuz appears in the original vocal score. A German translation by Rupert Koller is in the Chester study score and an English translation by Rollo Myers in the current vocal score bears the copyright date 1956. It is somewhat modified on the Stravinsky conducts Stravinsky recording; a more thoroughgoing revision heard on Robert Craft's 2005 recording is offered as the composer's own. Later, however, he told Craft: "I prefer to hear [it] in Russian or not at all."

=== Discrepancies ===
There are many discrepancies between full and vocal scores, particularly the PV's extra bass drum beat at the beginning, the study score's downbeat at the start of the allegro (not heard on Stravinsky's recording), the rebarring between figures 21 and 22, and the PV's missing third beat of the bassoon before figure 24.

== Score and music sample ==
Stravinsky first developed here an original technique of composition that was almost unknown in the European classical tradition, though quite typical of folk music. The main features of this are the repetition of small, simple melodic phrases (called in Russian попевки – popevki), often in syncopated rhythm, with an irregular meter (changing the time signature almost in every bar); the multi-voiced texture is not a real polyphony, but rather a heterophony, representing monophony or a “ragged unison”, where the melody of one instrument is accompanied and embellished with the fragments of the same melody. For example:

The first bars of the opening "March"

Sound sample of the first bars of the opening "March"

== Recordings ==
key: conductor – petukh (cock; tenor 1)/lisa (fox; tenor 2)/kot (cat; bass 1)/baran (ram; bass 2) – year recorded – first label

- Craft – Harmon/Hess/Galjour/Lishner – 1950 – Dial
- Ansermet – Sénéchal/Cuénod/Depraz/Rehfuss – 1956 – Decca
- Boulez – Giraudeau/Devos/Rondeleux/Depraz – 1961 – Disques Adès
- Stravinsky – Shirley/Driscoll/Murphy/Gramm – 1962 – Columbia
- Ansermet – English/Mitchinson/Glossop/Rouleau – 1964 – Decca
- Dutoit – Blazer/Tappy/Huttenlocher/Bastin – 1973 – Erato
- Mihály – Keönch/Gulyás/Polgár/Bordás – 1979 – Hungaroton
- Dunand – Marchisio/Blazer/Brodard/Loup – 1982 – Rencontre
- Chailly – Jenkins-N/Langridge/Hammond-Stroud/Lloyd – 1985 – Decca
- Salonen – Aler/Robson/Wilson-Johnson/Tomlinson – 1990 – Sony
- Ziegler – Harrhy/Hetherington/Donnelly/Cavallier – 1991 – ASV
- Craft – Baker-T/Martin-D/Evitts/Pauley – 1993 – MusicMasters 67110-2
- Wolff – Aler/Kelley/Opalach/Cheek – 1994 – Teldec
- Conlon – Caley/Grivnov/Naouri/Mikhailov – 1999 – EMI
- Craft – Aler/Spears/Evitts/Pauley – 2005 – Naxos
- Mantovani – Brutscher/Saelens/Gnatiuk/Nédélec – 2013 – PP distribution
- Gergiev – Timchenko/Trofimov/Petryanik/Vlasov – 2021 – Mariinsky label
