= Feu d'artifice =

1908 orchestral work by Igor Stravinsky

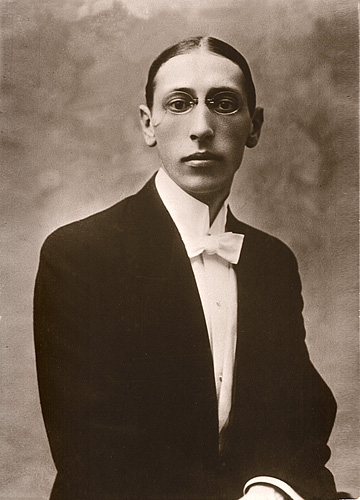
Igor Stravinsky c. 1905

Feu d'artifice, Op. 4 (Russian: Фейерверк, romanized: Feyerverk, lit. 'Fireworks') is a composition by Igor Stravinsky, written in 1908 and described by the composer as a "short orchestral fantasy". It usually takes less than four minutes to perform.

== Composition ==
Stravinsky composed Feu d'artifice as a wedding present for Nikolai Rimsky-Korsakov's daughter Nadezhda and Maximilian Steinberg, who had married a few days before her father's death. Feu d'artifice helped develop Stravinsky's reputation as a composer, although it is not considered representative of his mature work. The work has some hints of bitonality but is for the most part similar in style to that of Rimsky-Korsakov who, at the time, was his teacher and mentor. It has the form of a scherzo but is still labeled "orchestral fantasy" because of its short length.

Alexander Siloti conducted the premiere on 6 February 1909. The accepted story is that Stravinsky got the commission from Sergei Diaghilev to write The Firebird (1910) in part because Diaghilev heard this piece of music and was impressed with its orchestration. However, Diaghilev had already commissioned Stravinsky to orchestrate two pieces of Chopin (the Grande valse brillante and Nocturne in A flat) for the ballet Les Sylphides. Feu d'artifice was used as the opener of the opening night of the BBC Proms 2009.

== Instrumentation ==
The work is scored for piccolo, 2 flutes, 2 oboes (2nd doubling cor anglais), 3 clarinets (3rd doubling bass clarinet), 2 bassoons, 6 horns, 3 trumpets, 3 trombones, tuba, timpani, 2 percussionists (cymbals, bass drum, triangle, and glockenspiel), 2 harps, celesta, and strings.
