= Walter Nouvel =

Russian writer (1871–1949)

Walter Nouvel, by Konstantin Somov, September 1914, graphite and red chalk; Russian Museum

Walter Fyodorovich Nouvel (Russian: Вальтер Фёдорович Нувель, romanized: Valter Fyodorovich Nuvel; 1871–1949) was a Russian émigré art-lover and writer.

== Early life ==
Walter Nouvel met Sergei Pavlovich Diaghilev, future impresario of the Ballets Russes, when Diaghilev moved to Saint Petersburg to study law. Nouvel made up part of the Nevsky Pickwickians. Nouvel started working as a pseudo-manager for Mir iskusstva in 1898.

== Career ==
He co-wrote with Arnold Haskell a biography of Diaghilev (Diaghileff. His Artistic and Private life).

Nouvel fled Soviet Russia in 1919 and worked as secretary and factotum for Diaghilev's Ballets Russes.
