= Symphonies of Wind Instruments =

1920 work for winds by Igor Stravinsky

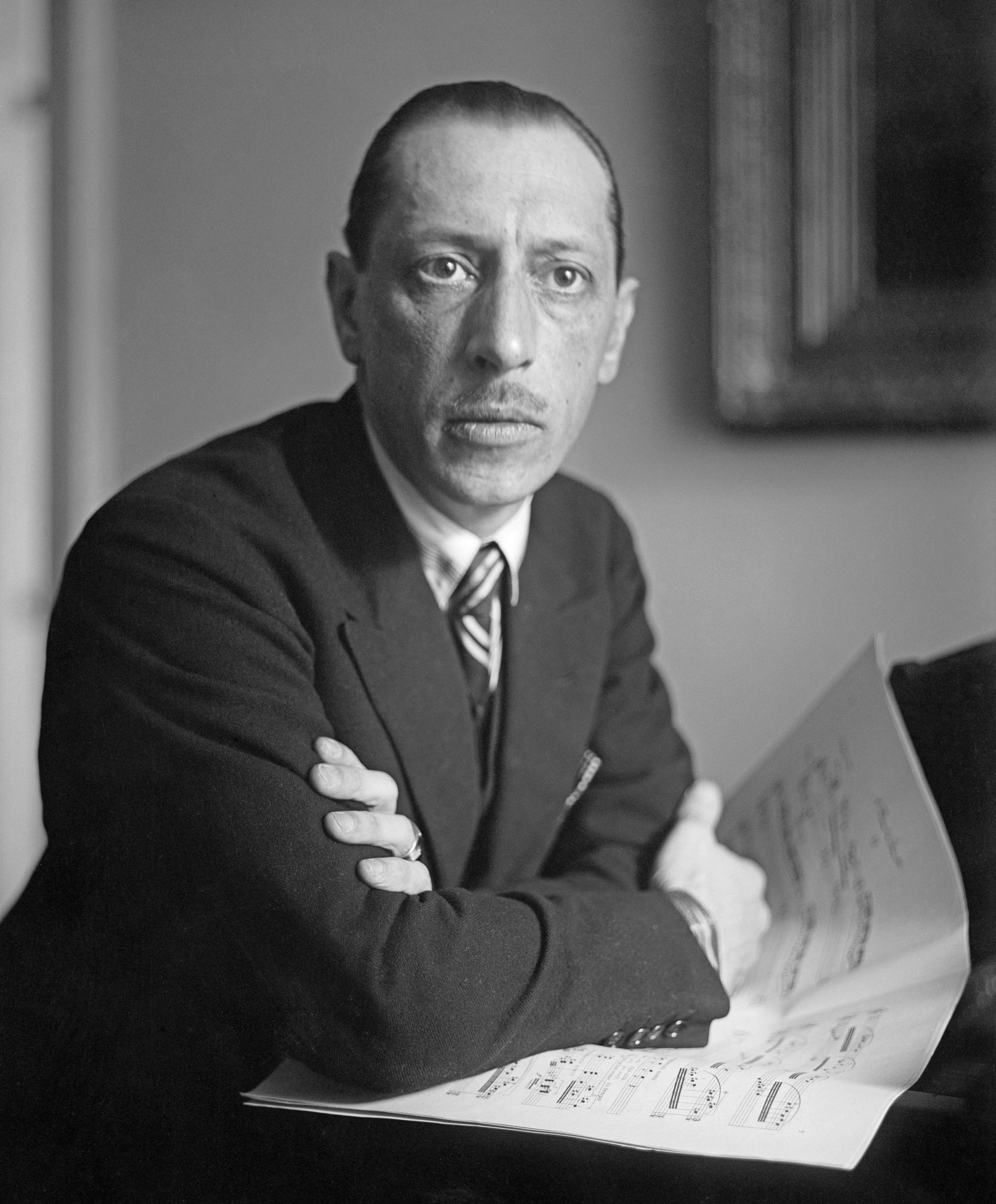
Stravinsky in the early 1920s

The Symphonies of Wind Instruments (French title: Symphonies d'instruments à vent) is a concert work written by Igor Stravinsky in 1920, for an ensemble of woodwind and brass instruments. The piece is in one movement, lasting about 9 minutes. It is dedicated to the memory of Claude Debussy, who died in 1918, and was premiered in London on 10 June 1921, conducted by Serge Koussevitzky.

A piano reduction by Arthur Lourié was published in 1926, a full score appearing only after Stravinsky re-orchestrated the work in 1947.

== Instrumentation ==
The Symphonies was originally scored for an ensemble of 24 wind instruments: 3 flutes (3rd doubling piccolo), alto flute, 2 oboes, English horn, 2 clarinets, alto clarinet in F, 3 bassoons (3rd doubling contrabassoon), 4 horns, 3 trumpets, 3 trombones, and tuba. The 1947 revision requires 23 players: 3 flutes, 2 oboes, English horn, 3 clarinets, 3 bassoons (3rd doubling contrabassoon), 4 horns, 3 trumpets, 3 trombones, and tuba.

== Analysis ==
In the title of this piece, Stravinsky used the word "symphonies" (note the plural form) not to label the work as an essay in the symphonic form, but rather in the word's older, broader connotation, from the Greek, of "sounding together". The music of the Symphonies draws on Russian folk elements, and is constructed of "contrasting episodes at three different yet related tempos".

The chorale which concludes the piece was originally published in the magazine La Revue musicale in an edition entitled Le Tombeau de Claude Debussy, which included short pieces from several composers, including Maurice Ravel and Manuel de Falla, dedicated to Debussy's memory. It appeared as a piano score in the Tombeau.

== Reception ==
The premiere at Queen's Hall, London, was greeted initially by laughter and derision from an audience unaccustomed to Stravinsky's experimental work. According to Arthur Rubinstein, who attended the performance with Stravinsky, laughter broke out during the bassoon segment, and the conductor, Koussevitzky, "instead of stopping the performance and addressing the audience with a few words, assuring them that it was a serious work in the modern idiom, smiled maliciously and even had a twinkle in his eye as he looked over his shoulder at the laughing audience". A reviewer for the Times reported, however, that the hisses "were no sign of ill-will towards the composer", and subsided when Stravinsky stood up at the end of the performance to bow.
