= Stravinsky (surname) =

Stravinsky is a surname. Notable people with the surname include:

- Igor Stravinsky (1882–1971), Russian composer, pianist and conductor
  - His father, Fyodor Stravinsky (1843–1902), Russian operatic bass
  - His son, Soulima Stravinsky (1910–1994), Swiss-American pianist and composer
- Marius Stravinsky (born 1979), British conductor
- Povilas Stravinsky, Lithuanian pianist
