= Yekaterina Stravinsky =

Wife of Igor Stravinsky (1881–1939)

- Екатерина Стравинская
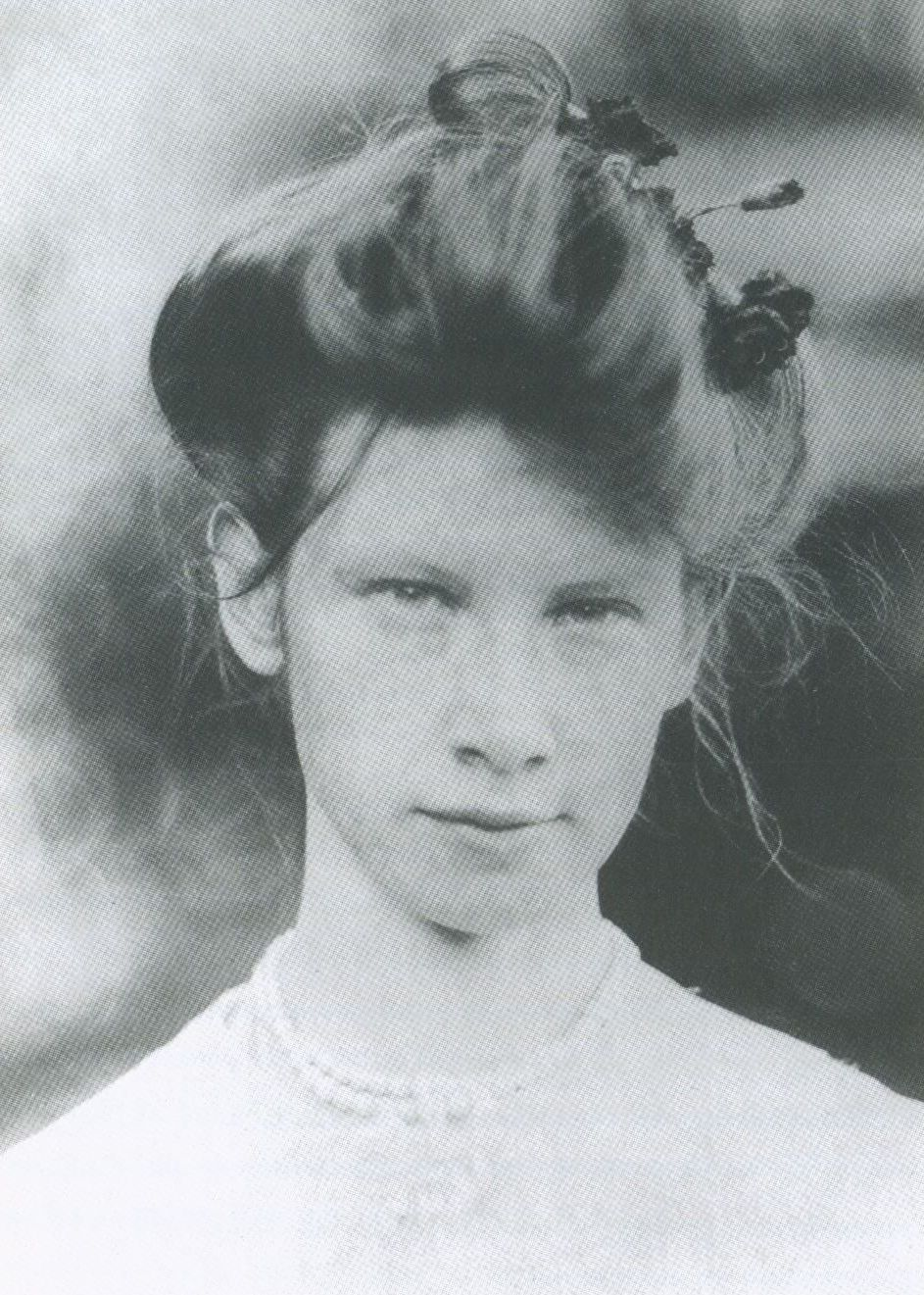
- Yekaterina in 1907
- Born: Yekaterina Gavrilovna Nosenko; January 25, 1881; Gorval, Russian Empire
- Died: March 2, 1939 (aged 58); Paris, France
- Resting place: Sainte-Geneviève-des-Bois Russian Cemetery
- Spouse: Igor Stravinsky (m. 1906)
- Children: 4, including Soulima and Théodore

Yekaterina Gavrilovna Stravinsky (Note: Russian: Екатерина Гавриловна Стравинская, romanized: Yekaterina Gavrilovna Stravinskaya; also known as Catherine and Katya) (née Nosenko; (Note: Russian: Носенко; sometimes transliterated as Nossenko) January 25, 1881 (Note: Russia used Old Style calendar dates until 1918. All dates preceding that year are converted in this article to New Style.) – March 2, 1939) was a Russian and French painter and amanuensis who was the cousin and first wife of Igor Stravinsky.

Born in Gorval, a village in Minsk Governorate, she spent most of her childhood in Kiev, where her mother died from tuberculosis in 1883. Yekaterina contracted latent tuberculosis from her mother, which would manifest itself later in her adult life. By the end of the decade, she moved to Ustilug, where her father had purchased an estate that formerly belonged to the Lubomirski family. As she matured, she developed her talent for painting, calligraphy, and music. After her father's death in 1897, she and her sister inherited the estate. Between 1901 and 1905 she studied art at the Académie Colarossi in Paris.

She first met her cousin Igor in 1890 during his family's first visit to the Nosenko estate in Ustilug. Their relationship developed into a furtive romance—which was accepted, but not openly acknowledged by their families—that culminated with their marriage in 1906. After spending their honeymoon in Finland, the couple moved into Igor's family home in Saint Petersburg, where she gave birth to the first of their four children. They built a new summer cottage for their family in Ustilug, which they would visit every summer until the outbreak of World War I, and moved to their own apartment in Saint Petersburg in 1909. After his international success with The Firebird in 1910, they and their family continuously moved around Switzerland and France until 1934, when they settled into their final home together along the Rue du Faubourg Saint-Honoré in the 8th arrondissement of Paris. Throughout their marriage, Yekaterina was the first to whom Igor would play his newest music, which she enjoyed. She was the principal copyist of his scores, counseled him on private and professional matters, and was an important influence in his reembrace of Russian Orthodox Christianity.

Chronic disease and Igor's adulterous affair with Vera Sudeikina marked her later years. His confession resulted in what he later described as a "tearful, Dostoyevskian scene", but he and Yekaterina agreed to maintain the marriage and their family's unity. In what musicologist Stephen Walsh called "an atrocious act of self-immolation", she acquiesced to Igor's demands to serve as an intermediary between him and Vera, establish an amicable relationship with her, and deliver the regular financial stipend he provided for her. By the 1930s, Yekaterina's health degraded to the point where Robert Craft observed that her marriage "had almost become purely vicarious". Both she and her eldest daughter became fatally ill with pneumonia in late 1938. Yekaterina, who outlived her daughter by three months, died in 1939. She is buried at Sainte-Geneviève-des-Bois Russian Cemetery.

== Biography ==
=== Early life ===
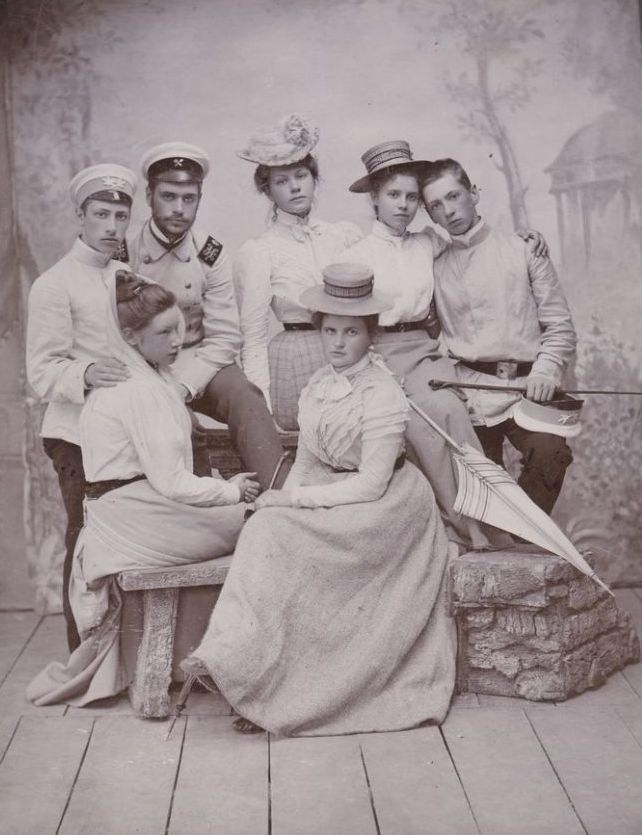
Portrait of the children of the Nosenko and Stravinsky families, circa late 1890s. Yekaterina is seated at the far left; her cousin, Igor, is resting his hand on her.

Yekaterina was born in the village of Gorval, located in the Rechitsky Uyezd of the Minsk Governorate, on January 25, 1881; and was christened on January 27. She was the second daughter of Gavriil Trofimovich, a college counselor and doctor who worked at Lukyanovskaya Prison, and Mariya Kirillovna Nosenko (née Kholodovsky); the couple was living temporarily at the Kholodovsky estate in Gorval at the time of Yekaterina's birth. Her father was a descendent of Cossacks who had served in the Chernigov Regiment; her mother descended from the Russian nobility, military officers, and government officials. Yekaterina's maternal aunt was Anna Kirillovna, later the wife of Fyodor Stravinsky and the mother of Igor. Mariya's first husband, whose ancestors included Ivan Pushchin, a Decembrist and friend of Alexander Pushkin, died from tuberculosis in 1876.

Yekaterina and her older sister Lyudmila spent most of their early childhood in Kiev. Although Gavriil had purchased property in Ustilug at some point in the early 1880s for the sake of moving his wife to a location where the weather would not aggravate her tuberculosis, there is no record of the Nosenko family living there until 1889. In October 1883, her mother died at the age of 35. A subsequent medical examination in June 1890 determined that Yekaterina had no trace of tuberculosis and that she was found to be "completely healthy", although in later life she became ill with the disease.

=== Ustilug ===
In 1887, Gavriil purchased an estate in Ustilug that consisted of several thousands of acres of land that had formerly belonged to the Lubomirski family. The Nosenko estate was soon recognized as one of the finest in the Volhynian Governorate and the family became known among locals for their charity work and efforts to improve social welfare. In the late 1890s, the Nosenkos built a free hospital, hired a doctor to attend to patients in the Ustilug area, and donated land for the establishment of a community cemetery. Later, when Yekaterina's sister married Grigory Belyankin, a graduate of the Marine Architecture Institute in Philadelphia, the family built a school and fire station as well. The Nosenko family was known for its benevolent treatment of their workers, who were among the few not to revolt against their owners during the Russian Revolution of 1905.

Gavriil died in 1897; he bequeathed the Ustilug estate to his daughters. His cousin Dmitri took over its management, while the responsibility for raising Yekaterina and her older sister Lyudmila was tasked to Sofiya Velsovskaya, a distant and elderly relative the Nosenko sisters nicknamed "Baba Sonya". Later, Grigory assumed control of the estate's daily affairs and modernized its equipment.

As Yekaterina matured, she became a talented painter and calligrapher. She also developed a profound interest in music and was regarded as a skilled musician.

=== First meeting with Stravinsky and growing affection ===
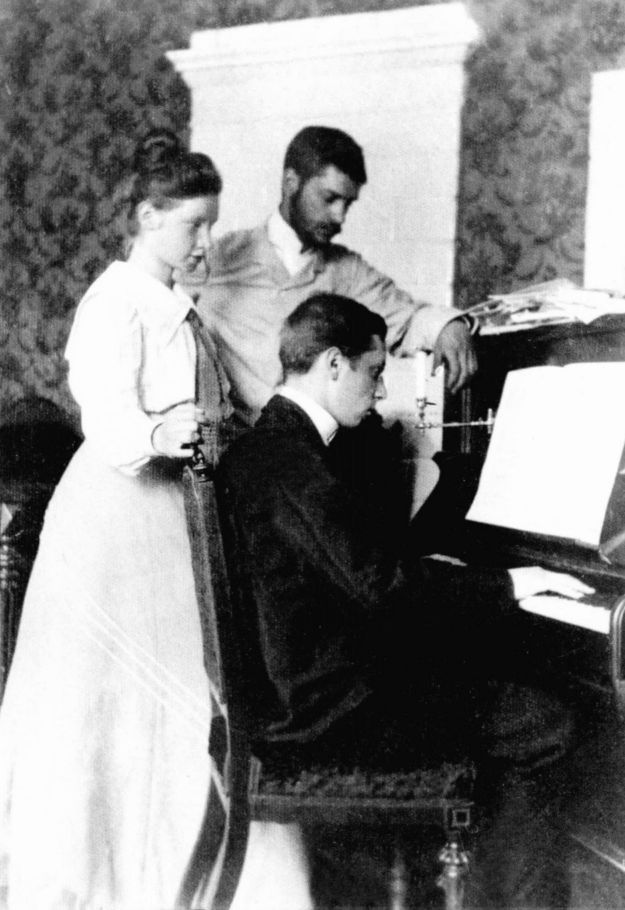
Yekaterina with Yury (center) and Igor Stravinsky (seated), 1900

Yekaterina first met her cousin Igor Stravinsky in September 1890, during his family's first visit to the Nosenko estate. In the early 1960s, he recalled to his amanuensis Robert Craft:

From our first hour together we both seemed to realize that we would one day marry—or so we told each other later. Perhaps we were always more like brother and sister. I was a deeply lonely child and I wanted a sister of my own. Catherine, who was my first cousin, came into my life as a kind of long-wanted sister ... We were from then until her death extremely close, and closer than lovers sometimes are, for mere lovers may be strangers though they live and love together all their lives ... Catherine was my dearest friend and playmate ... and from then until we grew into our marriage.

Musicologist and Stravinsky biographer Stephen Walsh wrote that Igor was attracted to Yekaterina's "serious-mindedness" and love of art which complemented his own:

And perhaps she was the one person in Igor's first 20 years who recognized in him something exceptional—even if she can hardly have guessed what it was. Above all, she gave him unqualified sympathy, which, for him, was always to be the pearl without price ... But she gave him much more than that, and one should guard against the implication that, in its physical and social aspects, [Yekaterina's] love left something to be desired. It was only later when it became necessary or convenient to make such distinctions.

They began referring to each other by affectionate nicknames; "Katyenka" and "Kotyulya" for Katerina, "Gimura" and "Gimochka" for Igor, which she used throughout her life. The two encouraged each other's interest in painting and drawing, swam together often, went on wild raspberry picks, helped build a tennis court, played piano duet music, and later organized group readings with their other cousins of books and political tracts from Fyodor Stravinsky's personal library. At the Ustilug estate they also mounted plays and entertainments, including Anton Chekhov's The Bear, which were acted by them and other members of the Nosenko and Stravinsky families.

On July 17, 1901, Stravinsky reported having been briefly infatuated with Lyudmila Kuxina, the best friend of Yekaterina to whom she bore a physical resemblance. By the end of the month, the "summer romance" had ended and Stravinsky, instead, wrote to his parents on July 27 that he had begun to take note of the "great change" in Yekaterina. Their relationship developed into a furtive romance which was accepted by both families, although not openly acknowledged at first. The precise dating of this shift cannot be ascertained, but it occurred before they formally announced their engagement on August 15, 1905. During the intervening four years that they did not see each other, Yekaterina completed her classical studies, then went to study painting at the Académie Colarossi in Paris. She regularly visited the Louvre in her spare time.

=== Wedding and early marriage ===
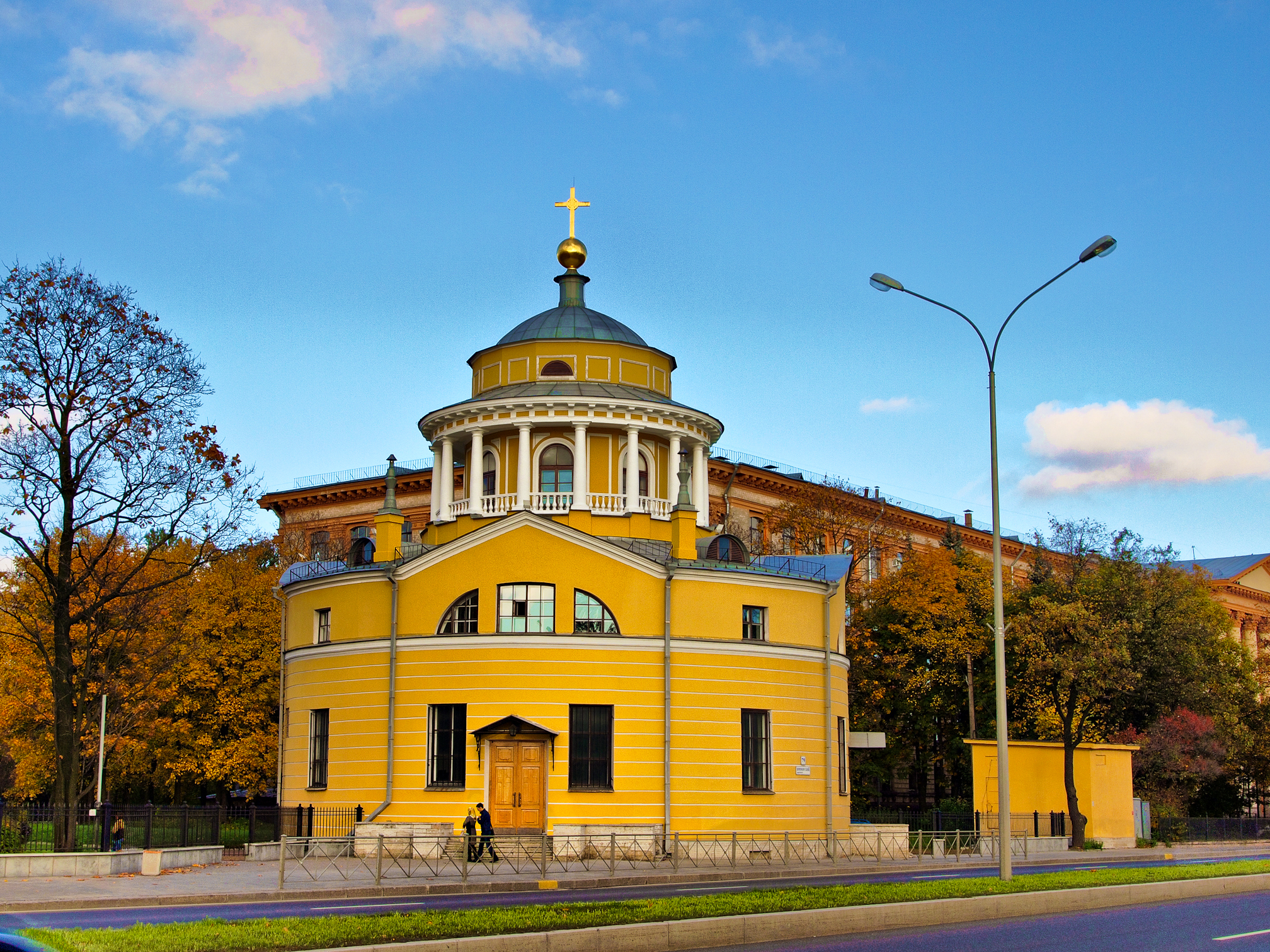
Yekaterina and Igor married at the Church of the Annunciation in the village of Novaya Derevnya

Yekaterina and Igor married on January 24, 1906, at the Church of the Annunciation, located in what was then Novaya Derevnya, a village five miles north from Saint Petersburg. Although as first cousins they were legally prohibited from marrying, they were able to procure Father Afanasy Papov, later described by the composer as "a kind of Graham Greene bootleg priest", to officiate the service without asking them for identification; Andrei and Vladimir Rimsky-Korsakov served as witnesses. After the ceremony, they visited the home of Igor's teacher, Nikolai Rimsky-Korsakov, who blessed them and presented them with an icon as a wedding gift.

The couple spent their honeymoon in Imatra and Helsingfors in Finland. They brought along with them the score to Rimsky-Korsakov's The Legend of the Invisible City of Kitezh, which they played and sang through together during the trip. According to Igor's later reminiscences, he also began to develop in his mind the music for what later became the vocal cycle Faun and Shepherdess, a setting of erotic verses by Alexander Pushkin, which he dedicated to Yekaterina.

After the honeymoon, the couple moved into the Stravinsky family home in Saint Petersburg along the Kryukov Canal, where they lived together with Igor's mother and brothers. Yekaterina got along well with her aunt, now new mother-in-law, despite the cramped living circumstances.

A modern reconstruction of Yekaterina and Igor's home in Ustilug

In May 1906, Yekaterina and Igor visited Kiev, before arriving at the Nosenko estate in Ustilug for the summer. Their projected vacation to Crimea with Baba Sonya was cancelled because of political unrest there during that period. By the time the couple returned to Saint Petersburg in September, Yekaterina was pregnant. She gave birth to her first son, Théodore, on February 20, 1907. Unable to produce enough milk to breastfeed her child, Katya immediately sent Igor to hire a wet nurse. Shortly after, Yekaterina chose to abandon pursuing a career in painting in order to devote herself to her family.

During the summer of 1907, Igor designed and supervised the building of a new house for him and his family on the Nosenko estate in Ustilug, which was built next to the residence of Yekaterina's sister and her husband. He called it a "haven for composition" and spent the summer months playing piano duet arrangements of Ludwig van Beethoven's symphonies with Yekaterina.

Yekaterina gave birth to a second child, Lyudmila, in December 1908. Their growing family and Igor's first professional successes led to the family moving to a new home on Angliysky Prospekt in 1909. Their residence there would be brief.

=== Switzerland and France ===
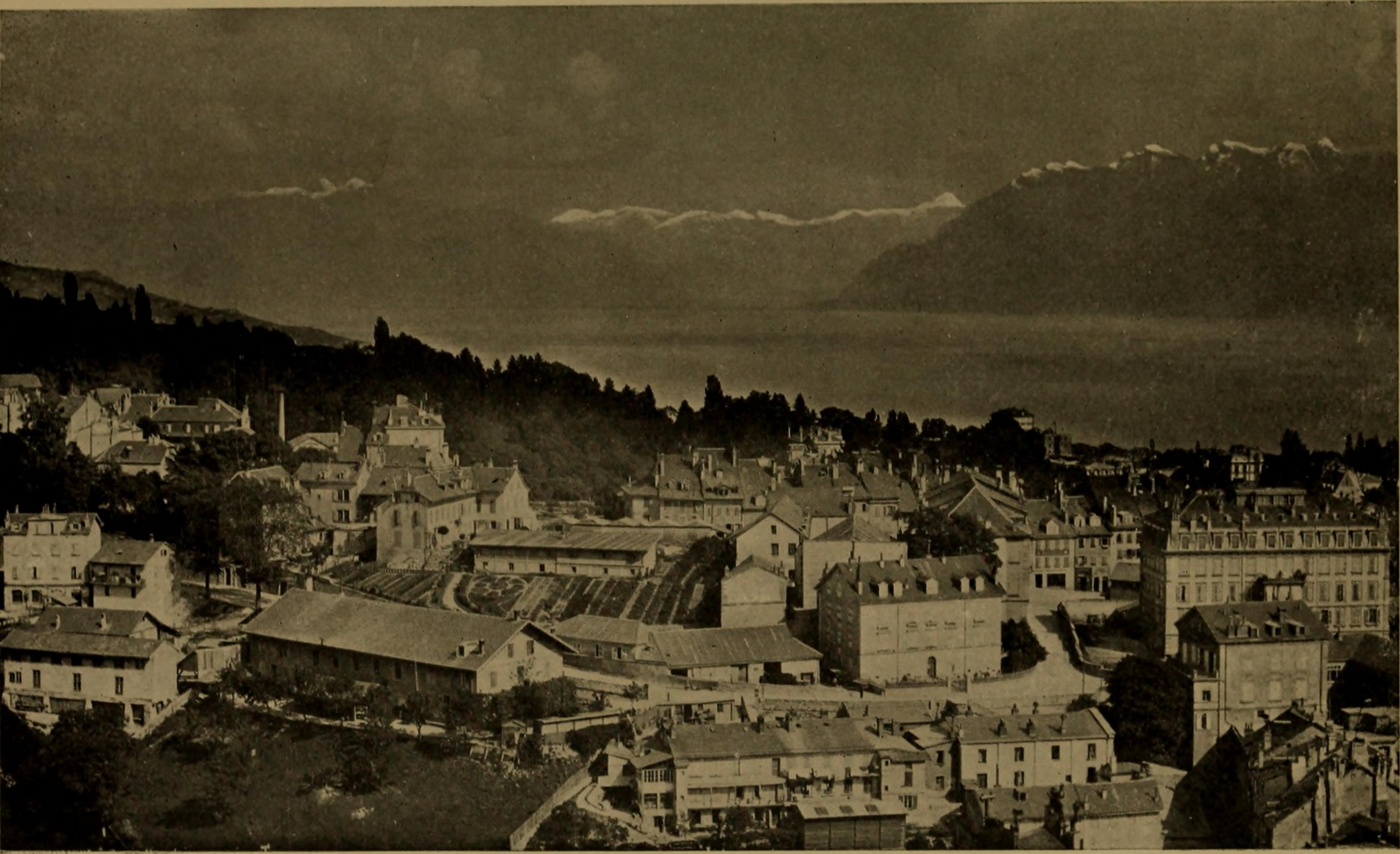
Lausanne in 1912

Igor's ballet The Firebird was premiered by the Ballets Russes in Paris on June 25, 1910, before an audience consisting of many leaders of Parisian music, literature, stage, and high society. Its success with the public and press was immediate. Yekaterina hurried from Ustilug to Paris with Igor, along with his mother and brother, to the final performance of The Firebird on July 7. They returned to Ustilug for two days, before Igor unilaterally decided against returning to Saint Petersburg, instead choosing to spend the winter in Switzerland and France. Igor wrote to a friend that the sudden move was for the "good of the children", while Théodore wrote that it was done for the sake of Yekaterina's "delicate health". Walsh speculates that the family's move was part of Igor's personal "grand plan" that had been spurred by the success of The Firebird and the "deep-seated Russian urge to escape from the icy grip of the northern winter".

By September 1910, Yekaterina, Igor, and their family had settled into a pension in Lausanne. There she gave birth to her third child, Soulima, on the 23rd. A few days later, she and her family moved to Clarens. In November, they moved again, this time to Beaulieu-sur-Mer. On May 6, 1911, Yekaterina and her family traveled to Italy where they parted ways. She and her children returned to Ustilug, via Basel and Berlin; while Igor continued to Genoa and Rome, where he completed his newest work, Petrushka. She returned to Paris to attend the rehearsals, followed by the premiere of the ballet on June 11. The couple left together for Ustilug on June 17. In the second week of July, the couple parted again, with Igor traveling to Talashkino to work with Nicholas Roerich on what would eventually become The Rite of Spring.

=== Crises emerge ===
In August, Igor departed to Karlsbad to meet with Diaghilev, which left Yekaterina unhappy. She wrote to her mother-in-law:

Today I'm particularly sad and depressed without Gimura; he's so far from me! In general I'm especially longing for his return this time ... And it still bothers me that Gimochka hasn't written at all.

The marriage came under strain because of Igor's frequent long work trips away from the family. His communication with Yekaterina became more sporadic, with lack of time cited for why he often preferred to send her brief telegrams instead of letters. Nevertheless, Yekaterina accepted the situation as necessary for Igor's continued fidelity to her and their family.

Yekaterina gave birth to her fourth and final child, Milène, on January 15, 1914, in Lausanne. The delivery had been routine, but soon after she began to manifest symptoms of tuberculosis. She was transferred to a sanatorium in Leysin, where she and Igor remained for three months. While there, the couple became friends with Jean Cocteau. By May she had recovered sufficiently to return to Clarens, where she decided with Igor not to return to Ustilug that summer. On July 28, World War I began; as a result, neither Yekaterina nor her family would ever again see Ustilug.

Russia's subsequent defeat forced her and Igor to settle in Switzerland until 1920. Their exile became final after the October Revolution and establishment of the Russian SFSR.

=== Vera ===
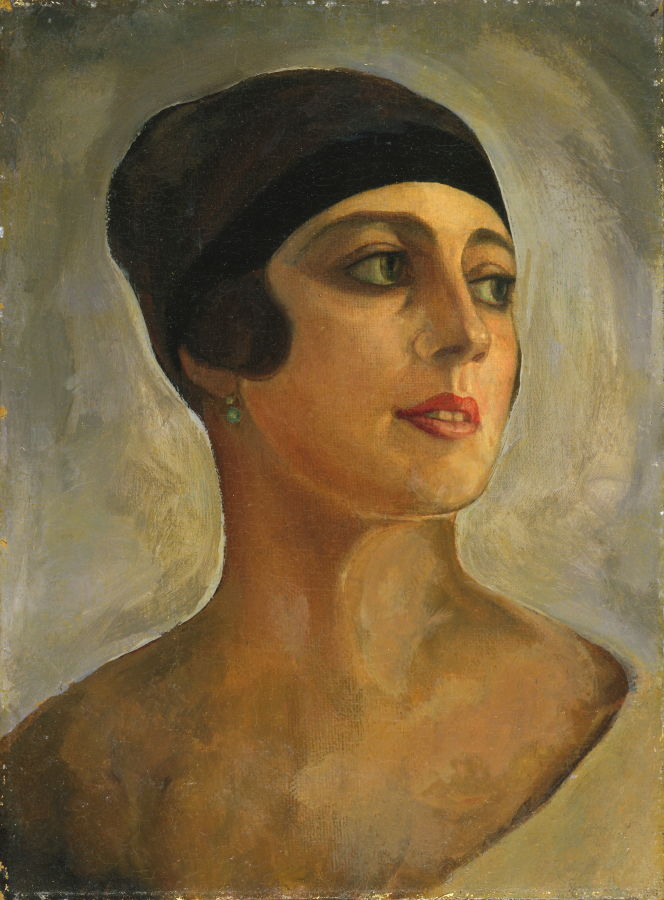
Portrait of Vera Sudeikina by her husband, Serge, 1924

The Stravinsky family moved into Anglet in southwestern France on March 9, 1921. The town had attracted a community of Russian expatriates, which grew after the Bolsheviks vanquished the Whites in the Russian Civil War.

At some point during the second week of July, probably the 14th, (Note: Igor and Vera celebrated July 14 as their "anniversary".) while in Paris after returning from London, Igor engaged in an adulterous affair with the wife of the painter Serge Sudeikin, Vera, whom he had first met in February. By the end of July, Vera was sending Igor letters to his residence in Anglet, urging him to return to Paris, and pleading with him to give her errands to run on his behalf. By the end of October, their affair was an open secret with the staff of the Ballets Russes. Serge learned of the affair and went to see Igor in Anglet, where he threatened him: "I cannot be responsible for my actions, I could kill [Vera]."

Vera wrote to Igor that "one cannot build one's happiness on the grief of another" and attempted to persuade him to terminate their affair. Igor did not want to relinquish his relationship with Vera, but also made it clear to her that he would not be leaving Yekaterina. In addition, he wanted Yekaterina to accept his infidelity and befriend Vera. In early 1922, he confessed the affair to Yekaterina, which led to a "tearful, Dostoyevskian scene". This was followed by Serge's estrangement from Vera in August. According to Denise Strawinsky, the wife of Théodore:

For [Yekaterina] there now began the long and terrible agony of her life, and a veil of sadness was drawn forever over her beautiful face. For her children's sake she learned how to conceal her torment, her injury. She wanted to see them playing happily, so she kept her knowledge to herself. She knew that Igor could be fickle, but now she had to learn to think of it in another way. With what grandeur of soul she faced the truth and accepted that the man she loved was leading a double life. From now on Igor would accommodate two women in his heart ...

Yekaterina and Igor resolved not to divorce and to maintain their family together.

On September 25, the Stravinskys moved to Nice. By December 1924, a correspondence between Yekaterina and Vera had begun. Yekaterina met Vera in March while Igor was touring the United States; their meeting had been arranged by him. What Yekaterina thought of the situation at this time is unknown for lack of epistolary evidence, although Vera reported that she told her: "If there has to be another woman, I am glad that it is you".

Igor supplied Vera with a regular stipend and an apartment in the Passy district of Paris, but delegated to Yekaterina with meeting his mistress at his bank and presenting her with the money, a task that Walsh described as "an atrocious act of self-immolation".

=== Chronic illness, final years, and death ===
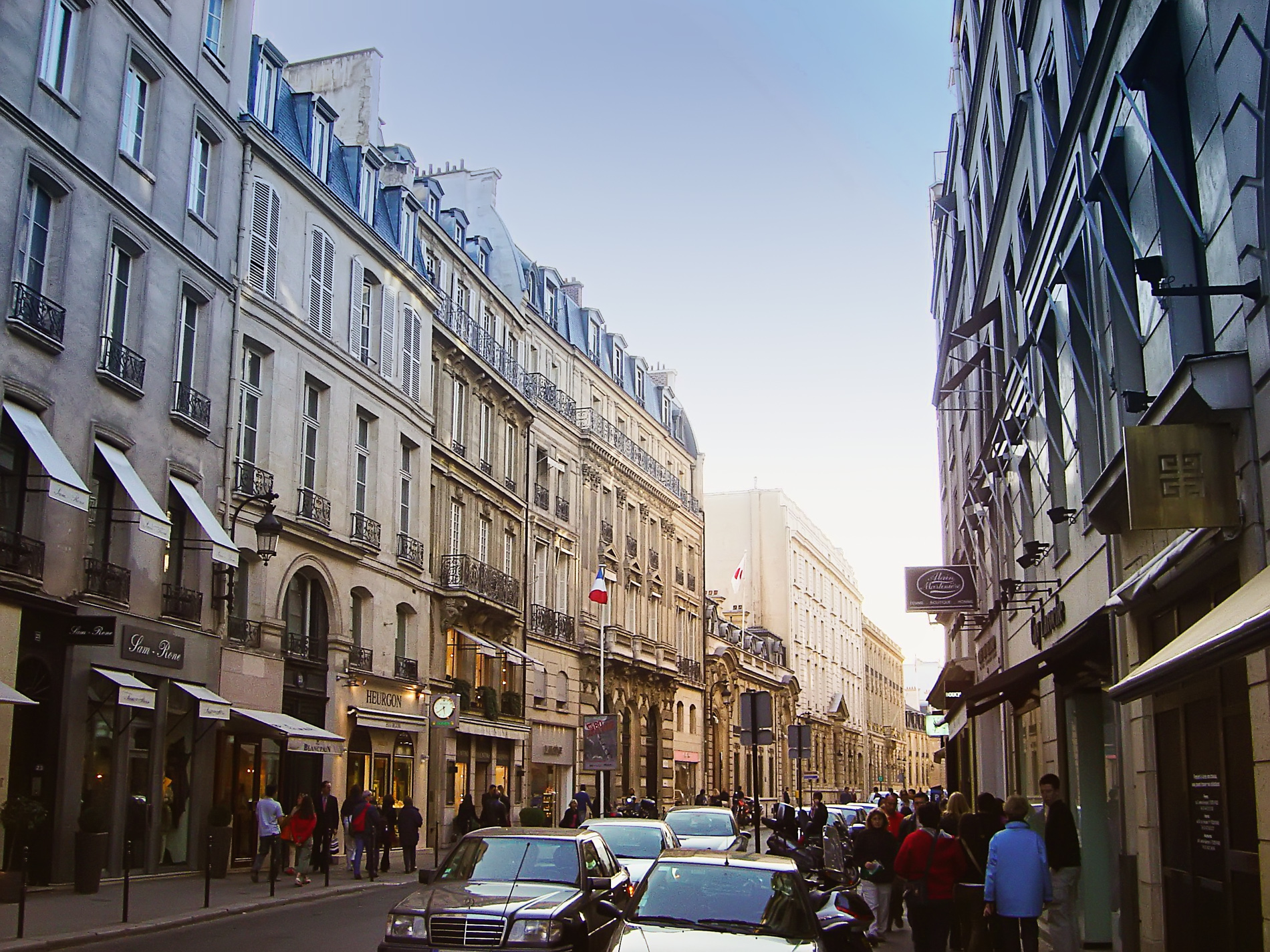
Yekaterina's final home was located along the Rue du Faubourg Saint-Honoré in Paris.

Soon after Igor returned from the United States, Yekaterina traveled with him to Italy for a series of concerts. While there, she became infected with the flu, which later progressed to pleurisy, requiring her to undergo surgery in order to remove fluid from her lungs. Unable to accompany Igor to his concerts or sightsee, she returned to Nice in early May. Her niece Tanya Stravinsky, who was then visiting, wrote to her parents in Leningrad on May 3:

They brought Aunt Katya in an ambulance ... Two days before she left [Rome], two liters of fluid were pumped out of her, as it was pushing intensely on her heart. Upon examination [her doctors] found the fluid to be tubercular in nature. Poor Auntie had to be brought in on a gurney. I was horrified to see how pale and exhausted she was. She was completely unable to speak. She is kept awake all night by awful, constant headaches. The whole household is despondent.

Her appendix was removed in January 1927, which left her in a weakened state. In July, she again came down with a case of pleurisy, which required her to remain in bed.

The Stravinskys moved to Paris in 1934, eventually settling on a home along the Rue du Faubourg Saint-Honoré in the 8th arrondissement. In January 1935, a flu epidemic had been circulating in the city, which infected Yekaterina. Weeks passed with her symptoms showing no abatement; by mid-March, a recurrence of chronic tuberculosis was confirmed. She checked herself into Sancellemoz, the first of several trips there that would continue until the end of her life. While there, she acclimated to ceding her role as the "dependable center, the guardian" of her family, although she maintained deep involvement in her children's personal lives. She also sent Igor frequent and thorough reports on her medical condition and treatment, which he expected and possibly demanded.

In February 1937, Yekaterina's sister Lyudmila had a stroke; she died on February 10. Craft observed that by the summer Yekaterina's own health had acutely worsened and that her marriage "had almost become purely vicarious". Vera visited and helped her with domestic tasks, although she and Yekaterina "had never been friends in the real sense of the word, as has been improperly suggested", according to Denise Strawinsky.

A quack, who had dubbed himself a "healer" and ingratiated himself among Russian Parisians, arrived in the Stravinskys' lives at this point; he claimed to be able to cure Yekaterina's tuberculosis by way of rhythmic breathing exercises that she had to take while scantily clad. Although both Yekaterina and Igor had faith in his treatments and refused to believe the protestations of their cousin Vera, a Swiss doctor, Théodore interceded and found another doctor who managed to convince them of the fraud perpetrated on them.

In late 1938, both Yekaterina and her eldest daughter, Lyudmila, were ill with pneumonia. After a brief recovery, Lyudmila relapsed and died on November 30, while Yekaterina's condition continued to worsen. When she was informed of her daughter's death by Théodore, she replied: "Fedya, I know, I have committed her to God".

As Yekaterina lay dying in early 1939, Igor returned and spent a great deal of time with her. Denise Strawinsky recalled:

In the last days of her life, she who never asked for anything, reverted to her childhood and amazed me by asking me to melt sugar for her and, when it turned amber, to pour it in pearl-like drops onto the marble mantelpiece. She would love to suck them. Dear Catherine, a tiny, distant memory of her childhood in Russia.

On March 1, after being briefly visited by Igor before leaving to meet Vera, she said: "Today I could have wished him to understand me as he has always understood me". She died on March 2. Her family, including Igor and her mother-in-law, were present. She is buried at Sainte-Geneviève-des-Bois Russian Cemetery.

== Personal qualities ==
=== Character ===
Yekaterina was well liked to the point of being "idolized" by her family. Craft described her as a "thoughtful woman ... and a kindly, wholly unselfish person, utterly incapable of meanness". While Igor tended to a defensive sense of optimism, Denise Strawinsky said that with Catherine "one could speak neither of optimism, nor pessimism, still less of fatalism, but rather of an awareness of people, which is to say another order of judgment".

She was very affectionate to her family, but tended towards shyness with others, did not like to entertain guests at home as she felt it was a "torment", and styled herself as an "enemy of guests". Her talents as hostess were praised, nevertheless; Charles Ferdinand Ramuz said that she "had the gift of creating harmony between people".

With her family, however, she enjoyed games, playing records, and sometimes joining them in dancing to foxtrots. A visiting family friend remarked of her: "The main personality in [the Stravinsky home] is undoubtedly Yekaterina".

Despite her chronic illness, each morning Yekaterina joined Igor in a bath, after which they would perform their daily calisthenics together.

=== Appearance ===
Unlike Igor, with his fastidious and dandyish sense of fashion, Yekaterina's attitude towards personal appearance was comparatively sober. Another niece, Xenia Stravinsky, recalled years later family impressions of Yekaterina in her youth:

This intelligent, profound, and exceptionally caring woman with her quiet charm. We heard so much about her from our parents, who loved and appreciated her dearly. In her youth and even later after she got married, Aunt Katya gave little consideration to her externals, dressed modestly...

Walsh, who wrote that Yekaterina's "beauty was not just spiritual", described documentary evidence of her appearance:

Photographs of her at the time of her marriage and before show a beguiling tenderness of facial expression: soft, deep-set eyes, a generous, but not sensuous mouth ... an air of calm inner poise ... Her style is homely or bourgeois Sunday-best, rather than mondaine or fashion-conscious. But there is little trace, at this or any other time, of the self-effacing "little woman". In photographs with Igor she does not recede, but looks directly and candidly at the viewer, to which one could add that Igor himself—though invariably unsmiling—seems to "belong" happily, even proudly in the environment defined by his wife.

Tanya, wrote to her parents during her stay with the Stravinskys in Nice that Yekaterina "looked very young", was "well dressed", and wore a discreet amount of makeup.

=== Christian faith ===
Yekaterina was not particularly pious in her youth, but became increasingly so after moving to France and with the worsening of her chronic illness. In a letter dated March 17, 1935, she wrote to Igor:

You say that you look forward to a normal life, but you won't find one, and we will bear this cross that God has sent us, and we will not stop praising Him and thanking Him.

She and Igor both received the sacraments of the Russian Orthodox Church Outside of Russia while living in Nice. Subsequently, she also became deeply knowledgeable in patristics.

== Influence on Stravinsky ==
Writings about Igor tend to marginalize the central role Yekaterina held in his life. The precedent was set by his autobiography: he never referred to Yekaterina by name the two times he mentioned her in the book, but as "my wife". Craft wrote that "a full study of [his life] must include the stories of both his marriages".

Yekaterina was the only member of the family permitted into Igor's work room, was the first to hear his new music, of which she was an attentive listener, and was the principal copyist of his scores. In her letters to him she expressed enjoyment of his music and offered encouragement. Her enthusiasm did not extend to his autobiography, of which she was critical and felt was a distraction from composing.

Privately, Yekaterina used her influence to tactfully and successfully persuade Igor on private and professional matters. She helped to ameliorate his relationship with his mother, whom he disliked. On some occasions, such as his failed bid to succeed Paul Dukas at the École Normale de Musique de Paris, he disregarded her advice.

Guilt over his affair and the example of Yekaterina influenced Igor's reembrace of Orthodox Christianity and the kindling of his interest in religious paraphernalia. On his work desk he kept a photo of her as a young woman that he adorned with flowers and also brought along on his travels.

On March 22, 1971, less than a month before his death and by then mostly unable to speak, Igor asked Vera for Yekaterina. "[She] is in Paris", she replied, then said in an aside to Craft that had he inquired further she would have been obligated to answer "in the cemetery".
