= Stravinsky (disambiguation) =

Igor Stravinsky (1882–1971) was a Russian composer, pianist and conductor.

Stravinsky may also refer to:

- Stravinsky (surname)
- Stravinsky (crater), a crater on the planet Mercury
- 4382 Stravinsky, an asteroid
- Stravinsky (horse)
