= Pavel Pabst =

Russian composer (1854–1897)

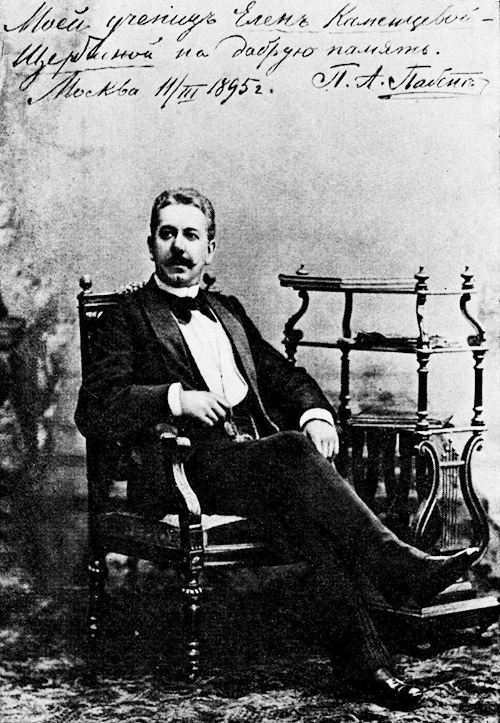
Pabst in 1895

Paul or Pavel Avgustovich Pabst (Russian: Павел Августович Пабст; born Christian Georg Paul Pabst; 15 May 1854 – 9 June 1897) was a German and Russian pianist, composer, and professor of piano at the Moscow Conservatory.

== Life and career ==
Pabst was born Christian Georg Paul Pabst (Russian: Христиан Георг Пауль Пабст) in 1854, into a family of musicians in Königsberg, the capital of East Prussia (present-day Kaliningrad, Russia). He studied piano with his father and then in Vienna with Anton Door and in Weimar with Franz Liszt. The young Pabst had a fortuitous meeting with Anton Rubinstein when he travelled to Königsberg as overseer of cultural programmes there.

Pabst moved to Riga, then in the Russian Empire, as an accomplished pianist in 1875. In the autumn of 1878, he accepted an invitation from Nikolai Rubinstein to teach at the Moscow Imperial Conservatory. In Russia he was known as Pavel Pabst. He was appointed Professor of Piano at the Conservatory in 1881 after Rubinstein's death, and taught there for the rest of his life. Amongst his pupils were Sergei Lyapunov, Nikolai Medtner and Aleksandr Goldenweiser.

Pyotr Ilyich Tchaikovsky frequently attended concerts given by Pabst, and used to refer to Pavel, as he was then known, as "a pianist of divine elegance", and "a pianist from God". In 1884, Tchaikovsky appointed Pabst to edit his piano works for publication.

Pabst's students carried the great tradition of Russian romanticism into the 20th century. Pabst was considered one of the greatest pianists of his day, admired even by the great Franz Liszt. He and the young Sergei Rachmaninoff performed many concerts together. Until 2005 Pabst was known as a composer only for his piano transcriptions of the music for the ballet and opera by Tchaikovsky. He also played the piano concerto by Anton Arensky, and was the soloist at its premiere. Pabst's piano transcriptions were admired by the most outstanding pianists of the time, and were considered to be on a par with those by Liszt himself.

Paul Pabst died suddenly in 1897 in Moscow and was buried at Vvedenskoye Cemetery. His funeral wreath from the Russian Musical Society contained the epitaph: "To Honored Artist - Indefatigable Professor - Hardly simply a man".

Marston Records has issued, as part of its CD set "The Dawn of Recording: The Julius Block Cylinders," more than 26 minutes of recordings of Paul Pabst as a performer, both on solo piano and as part of a piano duet (with Sergei Taneyev). These are the only known recordings of Pabst as a performer, and were made in 1892 and 1895. They include music by Chopin and Schumann, parts of Arensky's Suite No. 2 for Two Pianos, Op. 23, and Pabst's arrangements of music by Chopin and Tchaikovsky, as well as a composition by Pabst.

=== Original compositions ===
In 1885 he wrote his only orchestral work, the Piano Concerto in E-flat major. Its first performances were in St. Petersburg and Moscow, with Pabst as soloist, and with Anton Rubinstein conducting. The score was then lost, but has since been discovered. Pabst's Piano Concerto is a virtuoso showpiece in three movements, lasting 33 minutes, full of wonderful tunes and a fiendishly difficult but lyrical solo part.

On 19 April 2005, 120 years after its premiere, Pabst's 'Lost Concerto' was performed by Panagiotis Trochopoulos at a concert given in Minsk by the Belarusian State Academic Symphony Orchestra, conducted by Marius Stravinsky. A live recording was made by producer David Kent-Watson, and filmed for the documentary 'The Lost Concerto'. This live recording was used for the world premiere CD release of Pavel Pabst's Piano Concerto on Cameo Classics CC9033CD. A second recording was released by the Danacord label in 2008, with Oleg Marshev as the soloist.

Pabst also wrote a Trio in A major for piano, violin and cello, dedicated to Anton Rubinstein.

== Sources ==
- "Пабст, Павел Августович" . Brockhaus and Efron Encyclopedic Dictionary (in Russian). 1906.
