= Vera de Bosset =

Artist and wife of Igor Stravinsky (1889–1982)

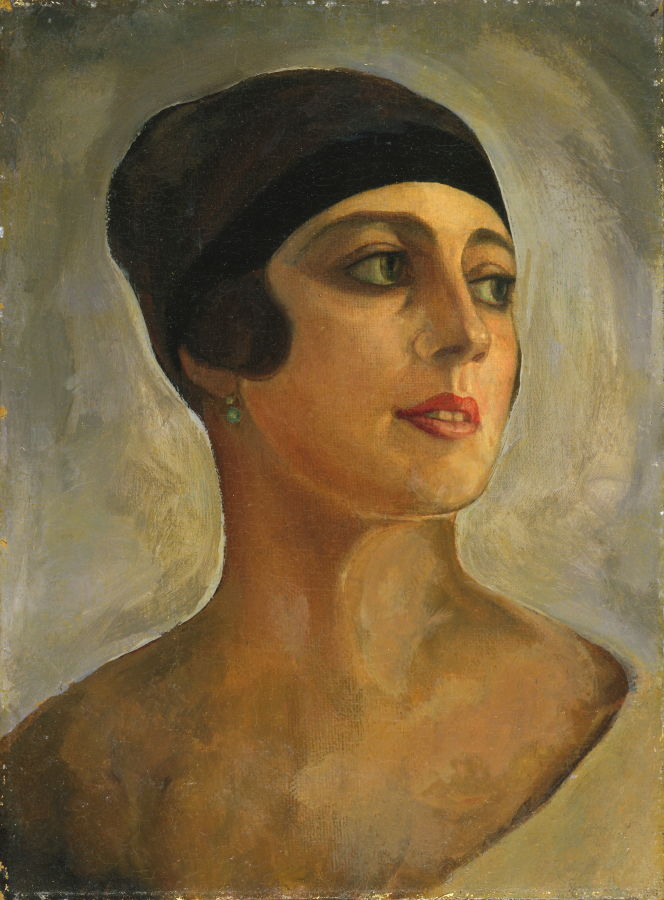
Vera de Bosset in 1924 by Serge Sudeikin

Vera de Bosset Stravinsky (January 7, 1889 – September 17, 1982) was an American dancer and artist. She is better known as the second wife of composer Igor Stravinsky, whom she married in 1940 after having been in an adulterous affair with him since July 1921.

== Life ==
Vera de Bosset was born Vera Bosse, the daughter of Arthur Harald Bosse (1861–1937) and Johanna Catherine Henriette Malmgren. Vera's father belonged to a well-known Baltic nobility, a brother of Eduard Theodor von Bosse. Robert Craft describes Vera as being born "to a French father and Swedish mother, neither with any Russian blood." She was sent to boarding school in Moscow, where she learned how to play piano. Vera allegedly changed her name to the French "de Bosset" to hide her German ancestry. She was the only one of her family to do so.

Stravinsky met Vera in 1921. She was a dancer and the wife of the painter and stage designer Serge Sudeikin. Stravinsky was then married to his cousin Yekaterina Nosenko and had four children. Stravinsky and Vera began an affair, which led to her leaving her husband. From then until the death of Yekaterina from pneumonia in March 1939, Stravinsky led a double life, spending most of his time with his wife and children and the rest with Vera. Yekaterina reportedly bore her husband's infidelity "with a mixture of magnanimity, bitterness, and compassion".

In September 1939, Stravinsky arrived in America to give the Charles Eliot Norton Lectures at Harvard University in Cambridge, Massachusetts. Vera followed in January 1940; they were married in Bedford, Massachusetts on March 9.

After Stravinsky's death in 1971, Vera continued to live in the New York apartment they had bought shortly before his death. She died in 1982 and is buried with Stravinsky in Venice's Isola di San Michele.

== See also ==
- List of Russian ballet dancers

== Sources ==
- Stravinsky: Chronicle of a Friendship, Craft, Robert, Nashville, Vanderbilt University Press. 1994. ISBN 0-8265-1258-5
- von Ruckteschell Family papers, taken care of by Georg Bosse, Kentucky, USA.
