= Théodore Strawinsky =

Russian and Swiss painter (1907–1989)

Théodore Igorevich Strawinsky
- Born: March 24, 1907; Saint Petersburg, Russia
- Died: May 16, 1989 (aged 82); Geneva, Switzerland
- Occupation: Painter
- Years active: 1914–1987
- Spouse: Denise Guerzoni (m. 1936)
- Parents: Igor Stravinsky (father); Yekaterina Stravinsky (mother)
- Relatives: Soulima Stravinsky (brother); Fyodor Stravinsky (grandfather)

Théodore Igorevich Strawinsky (Note: In this name that follows East Slavic naming customs, the patronymic is Igorevich and the family name is Strawinsky.) (Russian: Фёдор Игоревич Стравинский; March 24, 1907 – May 16, 1989) was a Russian-born painter.

== Life ==
Strawinsky was born in Saint Petersburg in 1907. His father was the composer Igor Stravinsky, who at the time of his son's birth was still under the private tutelage of Nikolai Rimsky-Korsakov, and his mother Yekaterina (née Nosenko), who came from a Ukrainian landowning family. When World War I began, his family took up residence in Switzerland. They first lived at the home of his father's friend Ernest Ansermet, then later moving into their own home in Morges. It was here where the young Strawinsky first began to demonstrate interest in painting, with his early efforts encouraged by Charles Ferdinand Ramuz and Alexandre Cingria.

He had his first solo exhibition in 1927 at the Galerie aux Quatre Chemins in Paris, subsequently spending two years studying at the Académie André Lhote in Montparnasse. In 1934, while in Meudon to meet with Jacques Maritain, he was introduced to Denise Guerzoni. On June 29, 1936, they married in Paris.

Although his father had obtained French citizenship for himself and most of his family in 1934, Strawinsky remained stateless as a consequence of the Russian Revolution. He remained in France at the outbreak of World War II, enlisted in the French Army in 1939, and was deployed to Le Mans. He was later discharged for health reasons and moved to Toulouse in 1940. Two years later Strawinsky moved with his wife to her hometown of Geneva, where they would live until his death on May 16, 1989.
