= Samuel Dushkin =

American musician (1891–1976)

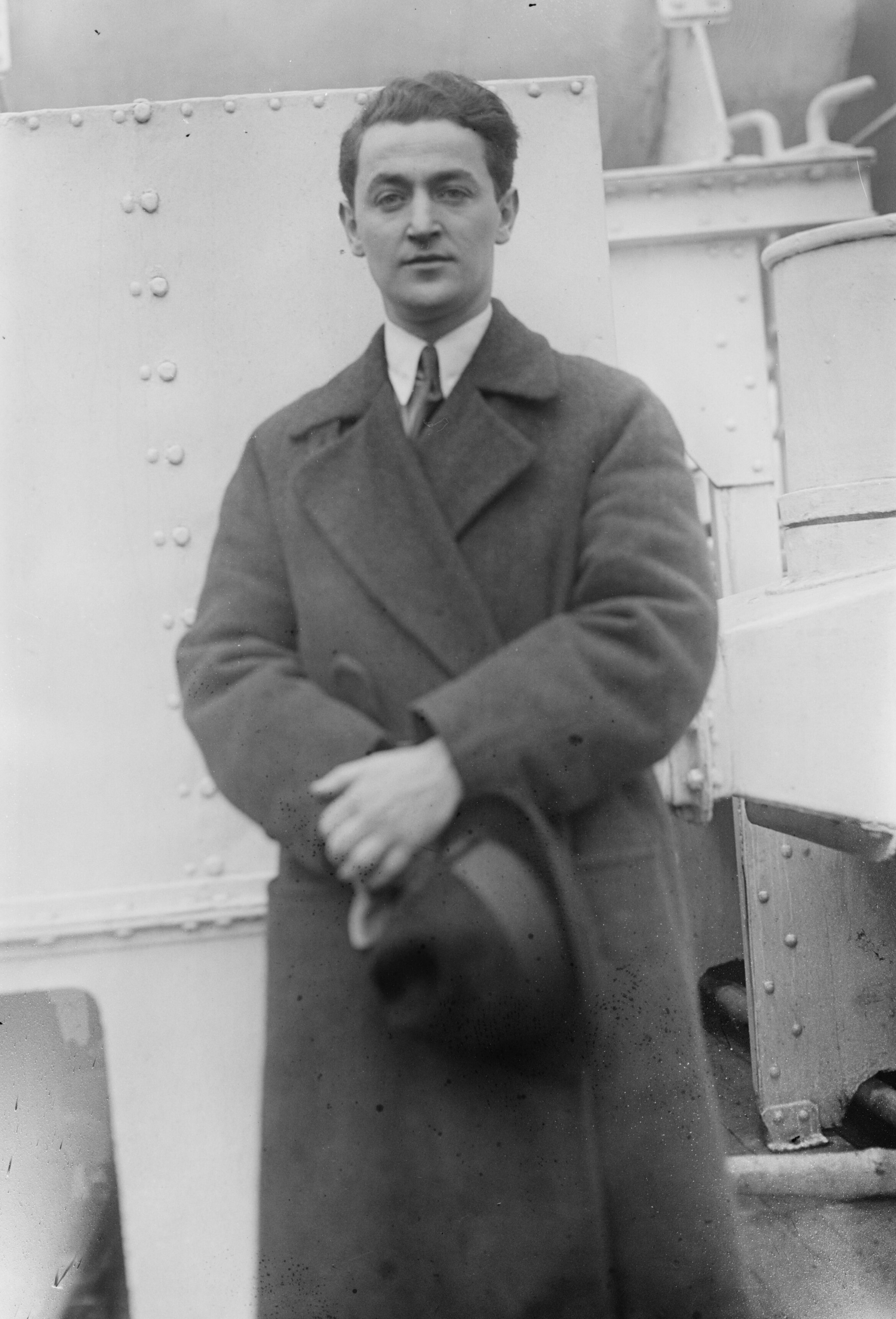
Samuel Dushkin, date unknown

Samuel Dushkin (December 13, 1891 – June 24, 1976) was an American violinist, composer, and pedagogue of Polish birth and Jewish origin.

Dushkin was born in Suwałki, Poland to Ze'ev and Miriam Dushkin. His brother was Alexander M. Dushkin.

He studied at the Conservatoire de Paris, as well as with Leopold Auer in New York City and Fritz Kreisler. He made his European debut in 1918 at the age of twenty-three, and six years later, his American debut with the New York Symphony Orchestra under Walter Damrosch.

Dushkin collaborated closely with Igor Stravinsky in the composition of the latter's first work for the violin, the Violin Concerto. He performed the concerto's world and US premieres, and on the debut Vox recording (VLP 6340) with Stravinsky conducting the Lamoureux Orchestra.

Stravinsky also composed his Duo Concertante and his Divertimento, both for violin and piano, to play with Dushkin on concert tours. They also worked together on violin transcriptions of other works, such as the Suite Italienne from Pulcinella.

Dushkin gave the premiere of Ravel's orchestral version of his Tzigane, in Amsterdam on 19 October 1924, with Pierre Monteux conducting the Concertgebouw Orchestra.

William Schuman's violin concerto, completed in 1947 in its original version, was the result of a commission from Dushkin that included a provision for the exclusive right to perform the work for three years. Schuman composed the concerto without ever having heard Dushkin perform publicly, and it proved too difficult. The premiere (given by Isaac Stern) was delayed until 1950 because Dushkin nevertheless insisted on maintaining his exclusive right to the work.

Dushkin owned two Stradivarius violins, a Guarneri del Gesù violin and a Guadagnini violin.

Dushkin published many arrangements and transcriptions for violin and piano, for example, pieces by Isaac Albéniz, Georges Bizet, Rudolf Felber (1891–1978), George Gershwin, Paul Kirman, Modest Mussorgsky, Sergei Rachmaninoff, Igor Stravinsky, Henryk Wieniawski and other composers. They are published as "Samuel Dushkin Repertoire". He was also the author of the "Grave for violin and orchestra by Johann Georg Benda", and the "Sicilienne in E-flat Major by Maria Theresia von Paradis", both musical hoaxes.

His younger brother, David Dushkin, also studied music in America and Paris. David, along with his wife, Dorothy, founded the Music Institute of Chicago in 1931, as well as the Kinhaven Music School in 1952.

Dushkin died in New York in 1976.

== Notes ==
- "Samuel Dushkin" The Concise Grove Dictionary of Music. Oxford University Press, Inc., 1994
- Stravinsky, Igor (1958). An Autobiography. New York: M. & J. Steuer. pp. 165–168. (Meeting with Samuel Dushkin)
