= Concerto for Two Pianos (Stravinsky) =

Neoclassical piano composition

- by Igor Stravinsky
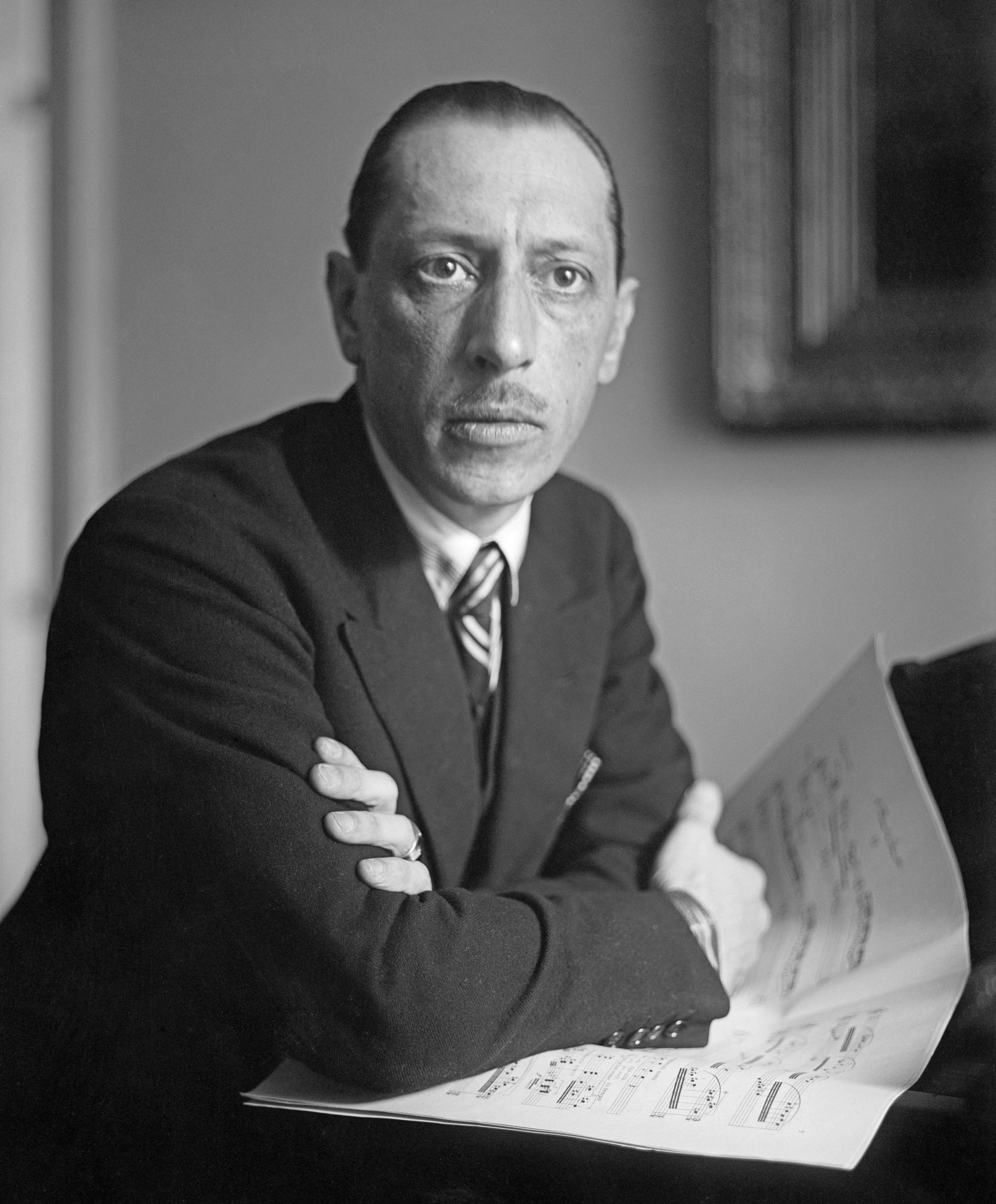
- Igor Stravinsky, at the time of the composition
- Native name: Concerto per due pianoforti soli
- Catalogue: W66 (Eric W. White); HH58 (Harry Halbreich); CC80 (Clifford Cæsar)
- Year: 1935
- Period: 20th-century classical music
- Style: Neoclassicism
- Composed: 1930–1935
- Duration: 20:00
- Movements: 4

Premiere
- Date: 21 November 1935
- Location: Paris
- Performers: Igor and Soulima Stravinsky

The Concerto for Two Pianos (sometimes also referred to as Concerto for Two Solo Pianos or rather as its Italian original name, Concerto per due pianoforti soli) is a composition by Russian composer Igor Stravinsky. It was finished on November 9, 1935 and, together with his Sonata for Two Pianos, is considered nowadays as one of his major compositions for piano during his neoclassical period. It was also Stravinsky's first work after becoming a French citizen.

== Composition ==
Stravinsky decided that, after composing his Concerto for Piano and Wind Instruments, he wanted to explore the capabilities of the piano as a solo instrument. Stravinsky had in mind a piece for which no orchestra would be needed (in case he lived in a city where no resident orchestra was actually established) and which could be played by himself and his son, Soulima Stravinsky. He began to work on a piece which would be the first movement of the Concerto in 1931 in Voreppe after finishing his Violin Concerto, although he found himself unable to complete a composition for which two pianos would play simultaneously and fully complement each other.

He then took a break and took up the concerto again after finishing his Duo Concertant and Persephone, even though he was interrupted again due to an appendectomy. Having figured out that he had given a three-year break to his composition, and this could result in a radical difference between its first movement and the rest of the work, he opted for asking Pleyel et Cie to build him a double piano, one appended to the back part of the other. Pleyel could eventually invent it, so Stravinsky finished the Concerto in 1935. In 1963, Stravinsky stated in a conversation with American conductor Robert Craft in their book Dialogues and a Diary (1963) that "the Concerto is perhaps my 'Favorite' among my purely instrumental pieces." Stravinsky claimed to have been inspired by variations by Brahms and Beethoven and, especially, by Beethoven's fugues.

=== Movement order ===
The order of the movements was a challenging issue for Stravinsky, due to his break at the time of composing this work. Stravinsky stated in a conversation with Robert Craft that the third movement was meant to be placed after the first movement. Nevertheless, Stravinsky expert Eric Walter White claims that Stravinsky had put the variations after the fugue but eventually decided to change it because the last chord of the fugue was stronger.

=== Key system ===
There are discernible patterns in the work that indicate that every movement is in a different tonality.

The first movement is in E minor, even though it modulates to B♭ major in its middle section, its most remote key possible. However, the background voices are often dissonant with the two melodic subjects, which generate bitonality. The second movement is in G major and, as in the first movement, it also modulates to D♭ major, its most remote key, in its central section. The first variation is in G minor and modulates to B♭ major, the second is in the same key as the previous one and modulates to C♯ minor, the third is still in the same key as the previous one and changes to A♯ minor (which is an enharmonic key with B♭ minor) and the last variation rotates round G minor or E♭ major while the harmonisation of the first piano implies C major. Ultimately, the last variation modulates to D major. Both the prelude and the fugue are in D, but, towards the end, a descending chromatic scale performed nonsimultaneously by both of the pianos makes it to change to E major.

== Performances ==
The composition was premièred in Paris, at a recital given in the Salle Gaveau by the Université des Annales on November 21, 1935. Stravinsky gave two concerts the same day (one in the morning and another one in the evening), giving a 15-minute speech before each one. The concert was subsequently played during the following months with his son Soulima Stravinsky throughout Europe and South America.

After playing it in Baden-Baden, Stravinsky signed a contract with the French subdivision of Columbia Records to make a commercial release of the concerto, which was eventually released after his death because of the war.

== Structure ==
The concerto is divided into four movements, even though the third movement is also split up into four different parts. A typical performance lasts approximately 20 minutes. The movement titles were originally written in Italian:

1. Con moto
2. Notturno: Adagietto (Nocturne)
3. Quattro variazioni (Four variations):
  - Variazione I (Variation I)
  - Variazione II (Variation II)
  - Variazione III (Variation III)
  - Variazione IV (Variation IV)
4. Preludio e fuga (Prelude and fugue)

=== I. Con moto ===
The first movement is in a form that recalls a first movement of a sonata, with its tonal regions and its recapitulation; this movement is full of repeated notes and chords, in which its energy and momentum is based. In the central section of this movement, sixteenth notes are grouped in sextuplets repeated in 4/4.

=== II. Notturno: Adagietto ===
The second movement, Notturno, was described by Stravinsky as "not so much night music as after-dinner music, in fact, a digestive to the largest movements", as he also stated that the first piano part was like "a ballerina represented by a harpsichord".

=== III. Quattro variazioni ===
Variation IV

The third movement is a collection of variations of a theme that is not present in that movement, but in the fugue of the following movement. These four variations are characterised by having different speeds, melodic lines in different octaves throughout the whole movement; in the last variation, a typical Stravinsky technique (an ostinato in G and B♭, that is, a third interval) is present. In various statements, Stravinsky claims he could have orchestrated this specific movement, but he wanted the composition to remain a composition for two pianos so that he and his son could play it.

=== IV. Preludio e fuga ===
The fourth and final movement is a slow prelude and a four-voiced fugue, followed by an after-fugue in which the notes of the theme are represented in inversion. Accompanying the four voices, one more voice repeats notes in sextuplets, which is a direct reference to the first movement. It ends with a strongly dissonant fortissimo chord by the two pianos, followed by a softer and more consonant chord which closes the concerto, though in 1957 Stravinsky expressed to American pianist Paul Jacobs that he wanted to leave out the softer chord. Stravinsky considered this movement the one in the whole concerto he was most fond of.

== Catalogues ==
The Concerto is included in some of the most complete catalogues of works by Igor Stravinsky. In Eric W. White's catalogue, the Concerto is listed with the reference number W66, Harry Halbreich lists it with the number HH58, and Clifford Cæsar lists it with the number CC80.

== Notable recordings ==
Notable recordings of this concerto include:

| Pianists | Record Company | Year of Recording | Format |
|---|---|---|---|
| Igor Stravinsky and Soulima Stravinsky | Columbia/EMI/Soundmark | 1938 | 78rpm, reissued on LP and CD |
| Vitya Vronsky and Victor Babin | Columbia Records | 1945 | LP and CD |
| Vera Appleton and Michael Field | Vox Records | c. 1950 | 78rpm and LP (in different couplings) |
| Aloys and Alfons Kontarsky | Wergo | 1962 | LP and CD |
| Vera and Vlastimil Lejsek | Supraphon | 1965 | LP |
| Paul Jacobs and Ursula Oppens | Arbiter/Nonesuch Records | 1977 | CD |
| Aloys and Alfons Kontarsky | Deutsche Grammophon | 1977 | LP and CD |
| Katia and Marielle Labèque | Philips | 1987 | CD |
| Benjamin Frith and Peter Hill | Naxos Records | 1995 | CD |
| Aglika Genova and Liuben Dimitrov | CPO | 1998 | CD |
| Marc-Andre Hamelin and Leif Ove Andsnes | Hyperion | 2018 | CD |
