= Violin Concerto (Stravinsky) =

1931 composition by Igor Stravinsky

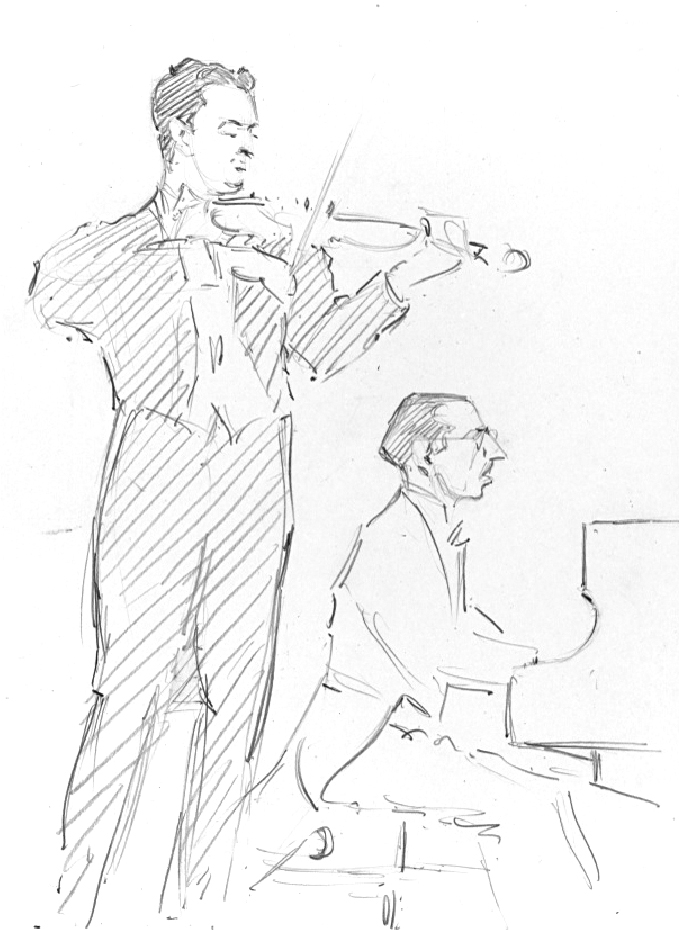
Samuel Dushkin and Igor Stravinsky, c.1930

Igor Stravinsky's Violin Concerto in D is a neoclassical violin concerto in four movements, composed in the summer of 1931 and premiered on October 23, 1931. It lasts approximately twenty minutes.

It was used by George Balanchine as music for two ballets.

== History ==
=== Conception ===
The Violin Concerto was commissioned by Blair Fairchild, an American composer, diplomat, and the patron of the young Polish violinist Samuel Dushkin.

Willy Strecker of B. Schotts Söhne, Stravinsky's music publisher at the time (and also a friend of Dushkin's), asked Stravinsky to compose a concerto for Dushkin. Though Stravinsky was reluctant, citing unfamiliarity with the instrument, Strecker assured the composer that Dushkin would consult about technical matters. Stravinsky noted in his autobiography that Dushkin's availability for such advice was a factor in his undertaking the Violin Concerto. He also sought the opinion of composer and violist Paul Hindemith, who allayed Stravinsky's fears, suggesting that his unfamiliarity with the instrument might help him come up with new possibilities. Stravinsky met with Dushkin at Strecker's residence in Wiesbaden and decided to go ahead.

=== Composition ===
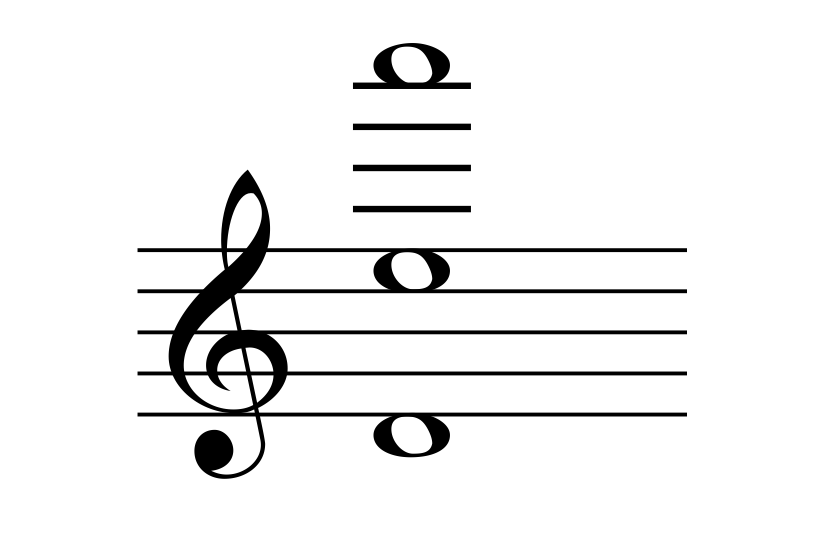
The "passport chord to the concerto", prominently featured in all movements

Early in the compositional process, Stravinsky devised a chord which stretches from D_{4} to E_{5} to A_{6}. One day while he and Dushkin were having lunch in a Paris restaurant, he sketched the chord on a napkin for the violinist, who thought the chord unplayable, to Stravinsky's disappointment. On returning home, however, Dushkin tried it out on his violin and was surprised to discover it was actually quite easy to play. He immediately telephoned Stravinsky to say that it could be played after all. The composer later referred to this chord as his "passport to the Concerto".

Stravinsky began sketching the Concerto in Paris early in 1931, with composition beginning in earnest in Nice, where the first two movements were completed and the third begun. In the summer, Stravinsky moved to the Château de la Véronnière in Voreppe in Isère, where he completed the third movement and wrote all of the fourth.

The manuscripts are dated May 20, 1931, for the first two movements and June 10, 1931, for the third, all in Nice, with no date given for the fourth. The full orchestral score is signed and dated "Voreppe (Isère) la Vironnière, 13/25. Sept. 1931".

Though Stravinsky told his publisher he wanted to write "a true virtuoso concerto", "the texture is always more characteristic of chamber music than orchestral music". He also observed "I did not compose a cadenza, not because I did not care about exploiting violin virtuosity, but because the violin in combination was my real interest. But virtuosity for its own sake has only a small role in my Concerto, and the technical demands of the piece are relatively tame."

=== Performances ===
The work was premiered on October 23, 1931, in Berlin, being broadcast, with Dushkin playing the violin and the Berlin Radio Symphony Orchestra conducted by Stravinsky himself. Dushkin also gave the work's first US performance in January 1932, with Serge Koussevitzky conducting the Boston Symphony Orchestra. He also made the first recording of the piece in 1935, with Stravinsky conducting the Orchestre Lamoureux.

== Music ==
In addition to the solo violin, the score calls for: piccolo, 2 flutes, 2 oboes, cor anglais, 2 clarinets in A/B♭, E♭ clarinet (doubling 3rd clarinet in A), 3 bassoons (third doubling contrabassoon), 4 horns, 3 trumpets, 3 trombones, tuba, timpani, bass drum, and strings.

The Violin Concerto has four movements:

1. Toccata
2. Aria I
3. Aria II
4. Capriccio

A typical performance of the concerto will last approximately 20 minutes.

== Ballet ==
The concerto was choreographed by George Balanchine as Balustrade in 1941. It premiered on January 22, 1941, with Colonel de Basil's company Original Ballet Russe. In 1972 Balanchine created a new ballet to the music, entitled Violin Concerto and since retitled Stravinsky Violin Concerto. It was premiered in 1972 by the New York City Ballet at the New York State Theatre as part of the Stravinsky Festival.

== See also ==
- Concerto in D (Stravinsky) (for string orchestra)

== Discography ==
Stravinsky himself recorded the work twice:

- Stravinsky: Concerto in D major. Samuel Dushkin (violin), Orchestre des concerts Lamoureux, Igor Stravinsky (cond.). Recorded in Paris, 1935. 78 RPM recording, 3 discs. Brunswick Polydor BP-1 (set); Brunswick Polydor 95500, 95001, 95002 (manual sequence); 95003, 95004, 95005 (automatic sequence); matrix numbers 771 GEP, 772 GEP, 768 GEP, 767 GEP, 769 GEP, and 770 GEP. [Chicago?]: Brunswick Polydor, [1938 or 1939].
  - Reissued as Vox album 173 (Vox 12014, 12015, 12016, automatic sequence). New York: Vox, 1947.
  - Reissued on LP, coupled with Stravinsky's Concerto for Two Pianos (Vera Appleton and Michael Field, pianos), New York: Vox, [ca. 1950–59].
  - Reissued as part of 5-CD set, Igor Stravinsky plays Igor Stravinsky. Vogue 665002 (VG 665 665002/1, VG 665 665002/2, VG 665 665002/3, VG 665 665002/4, VG 665 665002/5). [France]: Vogue, 1991.
  - Reissued on CD as part of Stravinsky Conducts Stravinsky: L'histoire du soldat; Pulcinella (excerpts); Violin Concerto; Jeu de cartes. Biddulph WHL 037. [France?]: Biddulph, 1997.
  - Reissued on CD, as part of Early Concerto Recordings 1934–1943. Jubiläums Edition. 5-CD set. Deutsche Grammophon 459 065-2 (Stravinsky concerto on disc 459 002-2) Deutsche Grammophon: Hamburg: Deutsche Grammophon, 1998.
- Igor Stravinsky: Concerto in D major for Violin and Orchestra, Symphony in Three Movements. Isaac Stern (violin), Columbia Symphony Orchestra, Igor Stravinsky (cond.). Recorded 12 February 1961. LP recording, 12 inch, stereo. Stravinsky Conducts Stravinsky. Columbia Masterworks ML 5731 (mono), MS 6331 (stereo). [New York]: Columbia, 1962. Also as CBS 72038. [England]: CBS, n.d.
  - Reissued on LP, in a new coupling with Concerto in D for String Orchestra, and Ode. CBS 74053. [Frankfurt am Main]: CBS, 1981. This same disc also as part of 2-LP set: Igor Stravinsky: The Recorded Legacy 3: Piano (Klavier) & Orchestra, Violin (violon, Geige) & Orchestra. On the second disc: Capriccio for Piano and Orchestra; Concerto for Piano and Wind Orchestra; Movements for piano and orchestra. CBS masterworks 79241. [Frankfurt am Main]: CBC Masterworks, 1981. CBS Masterworks GM31/LXX36940; CBS Masterworks [New York]: CBS Masterworks, 1981.
  - Reissued on CD, as part of Isaac Stern, a Life in Music v. 12: Artist Laureate. Sony Classical SMK 64 505. With George Rochberg: Concerto for Violin and Orchestra (Pittsburgh Symphony Orchestra, André Previn, conductor). New York: Sony Classical, 1995.
  - Reissued on CD, Stravinsky Edition, vol. 5. Sony Classical SMK 46295 With: Concerto for Piano and Wind Instruments, Capriccio for Piano and Orchestra (both with Philippe Entremont, piano), Movements for Piano and Orchestra (Charles Rosen, piano). [Great Britain]: Sony Classical, 1991. This same disc reissued as part of 22-disc set, Works of Igor Stravinsky. Disc 10: Concertos. Sony Classical 88697103112-10; [New York]: Sony Classical, 2007.
