= Alexander M. Dushkin =

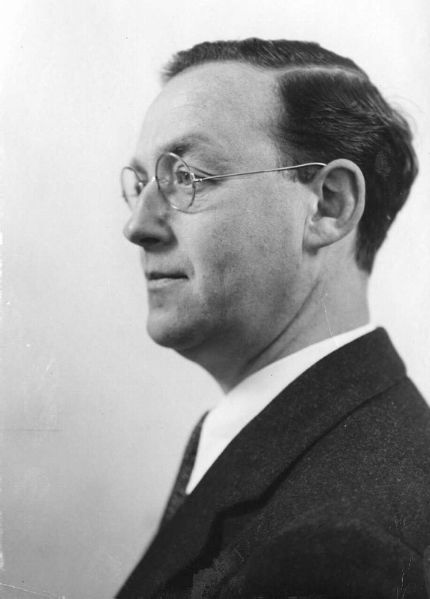
- Alexander Mordechai Dushkin
- Born: August 21, 1890; Suwalki, Poland
- Died: June 2, 1976 (aged 85)
- Education: City College of New York (1911); Columbia University (1913); Jewish Theological Seminary of America (1914); Columbia University's School of Education (1918)
- Relatives: Samuel Dushkin (brother); Naomi Amir (niece)
- Honours: Israel Prize in Education (1968); Worthy Citizen of Jerusalem (1973)

Alexander Mordecai Dushkin (August 21, 1890, Suwałki – June 2, 1976, Jerusalem) was a Hebrew educator, a teacher of education, and an educational thinker. He received the Israel Prize in Education in 1968 for his life's work and was received the Yakir Yerushalayim (Worthy Citizen of Jerusalem) prize in 1973.

== Early life and education ==
Alexander Mordecai Dushkin was born to Ze'ev and Miriam Dushkin in Suwałki, Poland (then part of the Russian Empire's Pale of Settlement), and immigrated to the United States with his family at the age of 11. He earned a bachelor's degree from the City College of New York in 1911, a master's degree from Columbia University in 1913, and graduated from the Teachers Institute of the Jewish Theological Seminary of America in 1914. In 1918, he received his doctorate from Columbia University's School of Education for his dissertation on "Jewish Education in New York City."

He was married to Julia Aronson and had two daughters: Kinneret married to Walter Joseph Gensler and Avima Lombard , a pioneer in the field of education.

His younger brother, Samuel Dushkin, was a renowned violinist. His sister, Eva (Chava) Dushkin, was married to District Court Judge Shalom Kassan. Their daughter (Dushkin's niece) was Professor Naomi Amir, a physician who founded the field of pediatric neurology in Israel.

== Career ==
He edited The Jewish Teacher (1916–19) which was the first English language Jewish education journal in the United States and edited Jewish Education (1929–35, 1939–49).

From 1923 to 1934 he was the head of the Board of Jewish Education in Chicago and created its College of Jewish Studies.

In 1935, he moved to Israel to found the Department of Education at the Hebrew University of Jerusalem. Together with Eliezer Rieger and Ben-Zion Dinur, he also founded the high school known as the Hebrew University Secondary School, or *Leyada*. The institution also served as a model school, helping to train student teachers from the Hebrew University, based on John Dewey's teachings, and named after him. Dushkin was its first principal.

He returned to the US in 1939 as executive director of the newly created New York Committee for Jewish Education. The objectives of the committee, headed by Supreme Court Justice Samuel I. Rosenman, were to coordinate different local groups involved in Jewish education and to increase the number and financing of educational activities.

Dushkin also served as Chairman of the Advisory Committee for Hadassah Youth Services from 1943 to 1949 in particular his involvement with Youth Aliyah. In 1949 when he returned to Israel and to the Hebrew University, he was their education consultant and introduced the idea that Youth Aliyah create vocational training in industry and agriculture and establishment of an Equipment Fund to aid in the training of Youth Aliyah trainees. He also helped create a Training School for Teachers of Home Economics and was very involved in the International Cultural Center for Youth (ICCY) in Jerusalem.

He retired from Hebrew University in 1958 and passed away in 1976 at age 85 He is buried in Har Hamenuchot cemetery in Jerusalem.

== Books published ==
Comparative Study of the Jewish Teacher Training Schools in the Diaspora, 1970, Institute of Contemporary Jewry, Hebrew University

Living Bridges: Memoirs of an Educator, Alexander M. Dushkin, Jerusalem: Keter Publishing House, 1975.

Jewish Education (published posthumously), Magnes Press, 1980, ISBN 978-965-223-353-0

Jewish Education in the Diaspora – The Problem of Teachers, Jerusalem, 1968.

== Key articles ==
The Jewish Charities and Jewish Education, 1931

The Jewish Educational System—A Plea for Organic Unity, 1932

Aims and Activities of Jewish Educational Organizations in America, 1933

The Community Principle in Jewish Education, 1946

Aims of Jewish Education in the Diaspora, 1947

The New Plan of Studies at the Hebrew University, 1950

Israel and the Teaching of Jewish Identity, 1973

Fifty Years of American Jewish Education, Retrospect and Prospect, 1967

== Articles written about Dushkin ==
- In Memoriam: Alexander Mordecai Dushkin
- Albert Schoolman, Dr. Alexander M. Dushkin at Eighty Some Intimate “Behind-Scene” Experiences
- Tamar de Sola Pool, Julia and Alexander Dushkin in the History of Hadassah
- Mordecai Kaplan, In Tribute to Alexander M. Dushkin
- Jacob Katz, “Thoughts on a Judaistic Trend in Secondary Schools,” in Meir Shapira, ed., Principles and Practices in Secondary Education: Alexander M. Dushkin Jubilee Volume (Hebrew)
- Israel Goldstein, My Association with Alexander M. Dushkin
