= Povilas Stravinsky =

Lithuanian pianist

Povilas Stravinsky is a Lithuanian pianist active in the United States, where he serves as the Orchestra Seattle artist in residence.

A graduate from the Moscow Conservatory, he has been a professor at the Lithuanian Academy of Music and Theatre and was named an Honored Artist of Lithuania. He has recorded for Melodiya.

== Family ==
Son - Marius Stravinsky
