= Marius Stravinsky =

Kazakh-British conductor (born 1979)

- Born: 1979 (age 46–47); Almaty, Kazakhstan
- Occupation: Conductor
- Years active: 2002-present

Marius Stravinsky (born 1979) is a Kazakh-British conductor and violinist.

== Career ==
Whilst resident at Helikon Opera, his performances included fully staged productions of Berg ("Lulu"), Bizet ("Carmen"), Giordano ("Siberia"), Poulenc ("Les Dialogue des Carmelites"), Prokofiev ("The Story of a Real Man"), Rimsky-Korsakov ("Kaschei the Immortal"), Shostakovich ("Lady Macbeth of the Mtensk District"), and works by Igor Stravinsky (such as "Mavra"). In 2007, Stravinsky was awarded the position of Chief Conductor & Artistic Director of the Karelia Philharmonic Orchestra, and following his five-year tenure in this role, he then – at the personal invitation of Vladimir Jurowski – took up the position of Assistant Conductor of the London Philharmonic Orchestra for the 2013/2014 season.

Stravinsky's discography includes recordings of Ignaz Brüll’s Violin Concerto and Symphony in E minor, Salomon Jadassohn’s Symphony No.1, and Pavel Pabst’s Piano Concerto, on the Cameo Classics Label. During his tenure as Chief Conductor & Artistic Director, Stravinsky also released recordings of major works by Maurice Blower, Dorothy Howell, Joseph Holbrooke and Sergey Zhukov with the Karelia Philharmonic Orchestra.

== Personal life ==
Marius Stravinsky is related to Igor Stravinsky, Russian composer.

- Father: Povilas Stravinsky
- Mother: Eleonora Bekova
