= Soulima Stravinsky =

American pianist (1910–1994)

- Сулима Стравинский
- Soulima Stravinsky c. 1950
- Born: September 23, 1910; Lausanne, Switzerland
- Died: November 28, 1994 (aged 84); Sarasota, Florida, U.S.
- Other name: Sviatoslav Igorevich Soulima Stravinsky
- Occupations: Pianist, composer, musicologist
- Spouse: Francoise Bon (m. 1946)
- Parents: Igor Stravinsky (father); Yekaterina Stravinsky (mother)
- Relatives: Théodore Strawinsky (brother); Fyodor Stravinsky (grandfather)

Sviatoslav Igorevich Soulima Stravinsky (Note: In this name that follows East Slavic naming customs, the patronymic is Igorevich and the family name is Soulima-Stravinsky.) (Note: Russian: Святослав Игоревич Сулима-Стравинский, romanized: Svyatoslav Igorevich Sulima-Stravinsky) (23 September 1910 – 28 November 1994) was a Swiss and American pianist, composer, and musicologist. As a pianist, he was considered an important interpreter of the works of his father, Igor Stravinsky, but as a composer he was overshadowed by his father.

== Biography ==
Soulima Stravinsky was born in Lausanne, Switzerland, in 1910, the second son and third child of Igor and Yekaterina Stravinsky. He was the grandson of Fyodor Stravinsky.

He studied piano with Isidor Philipp as well as theory and composition with Nadia Boulanger. He appeared in Paris in 1934 playing his father's Concerto for Piano and Winds, Capriccio for Piano and Orchestra and the Concerto for Two Pianos. He recorded these works with his father in 1938.

He played in London at the 1937 season of the Proms.

Igor Stravinsky moved to the United States in 1939, but Soulima joined the French army and remained in Europe for nine more years. He moved to the United States in 1948, making his American debut that year at the Red Rocks Festival in Colorado and his New York debut with the CBS Symphony Orchestra.

In 1950, Soulima Stravinsky was appointed to the piano faculty of the School of Music of the University of Illinois, where he remained until 1978. He continued his concerto solo career and began distinguishing himself as a composer, transcriber and editor. In addition to his many musical compositions, he wrote books on orchestration and the orchestra. His book on orchestration contains an excellent section on brass instruments including many unusual instruments.

In 1974, Stravinsky was awarded the "Chevalier des Arts et des Lettres" by the French Ministry of Cultural Affairs.

He died in Sarasota, Florida in 1994.

About nine months after his death, his widow Francoise found a previously unknown work amongst Soulima's papers—a Lamento for cello and piano. It was in incomplete form, but it was edited and performed for the first time before Francoise herself died.

=== Works ===
- Etudes Pittoresques (20), for piano
- The Art of Scales (24 Preludes), for piano
- The Art of Fingering (12 Preludes), for piano
- 6 Sonatinas for Young Pianists, for piano (or harpsichord)
- Piano Suite for the Right Hand
- Music Alphabet, for piano
- Piano Music for Children, Volume 1 (19 pieces)
- Suite for Viola Solo (1975)
- Sonata for Cello and Piano (1990)
- Lamento, cello and piano (posth.)
- Three string quartets (recorded on CD, label Polymnie)
- Cadenzas (18) and lead-ins (4) to Mozart's piano concerti:
  - No. 6 in B flat, K. 238
  - No. 8 in C, K. 246
  - Double Concerto in E flat, K. 365
  - No. 11 in F, K. 413
  - No. 20 in D minor, K. 466
  - No. 21 in C, K. 467 Elvira Madigan
  - No. 22 in E flat, K. 482
  - No. 24 in C minor, K. 491
  - No. 25 in C, K. 503, and
  - No. 26 in D, K. 537 Coronation.
