= Serge Sudeikin =

Russian painter

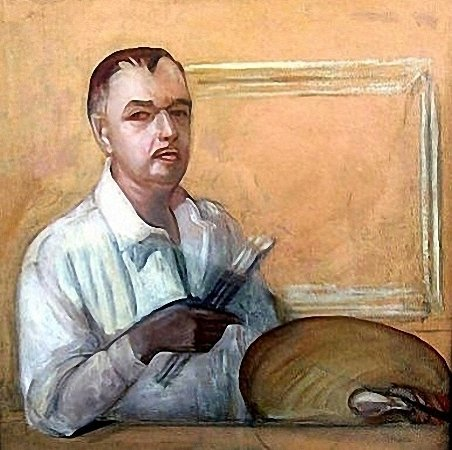
Self-portrait

Sergey Yurievich Sudeikin, also known as Serge Soudeikine (19 March 1882 in Saint Petersburg – 12 August 1946 in Nyack, New York), was a Russian artist and set-designer associated with the Ballets Russes and the Metropolitan Opera.

== Biography ==
Having been banned from the Moscow School of Painting, Sculpture and Architecture for his "obscene drawings", Sudeikin joined the Mir Iskusstva movement. His close friends included the poet Mikhail Kuzmin and the impresario Serge Diaghilev, at whose invitation he came to Paris in 1906 for the Salon d'Automne Exhibition, where his work was first shown abroad. From 1907 to 1918 he was married to actress Olga Glebova (1885–1945), one of the famed beauties of St Petersburg and the closest friend of Anna Akhmatova. Glebova-Sudeikina is the principal character and addressee of Akhmatova's longest work, The Poem Without Hero (1940–65).

Sudeikin designed the sets and costumes for Diaghilev's production of La tragédie de Salomé by Florent Schmitt in 1913, and assisted in the execution of Nicholas Roerich's designs for Stravinsky's The Rite of Spring the same year. By the time of the October Revolution Sudeikin was among the foremost theatrical designers in Russia. In 1913 he had eloped to Paris with the dancer Vera de Bosset, whom he subsequently married, and who in the 1920s left him to become the mistress and ultimately second wife of Stravinsky.

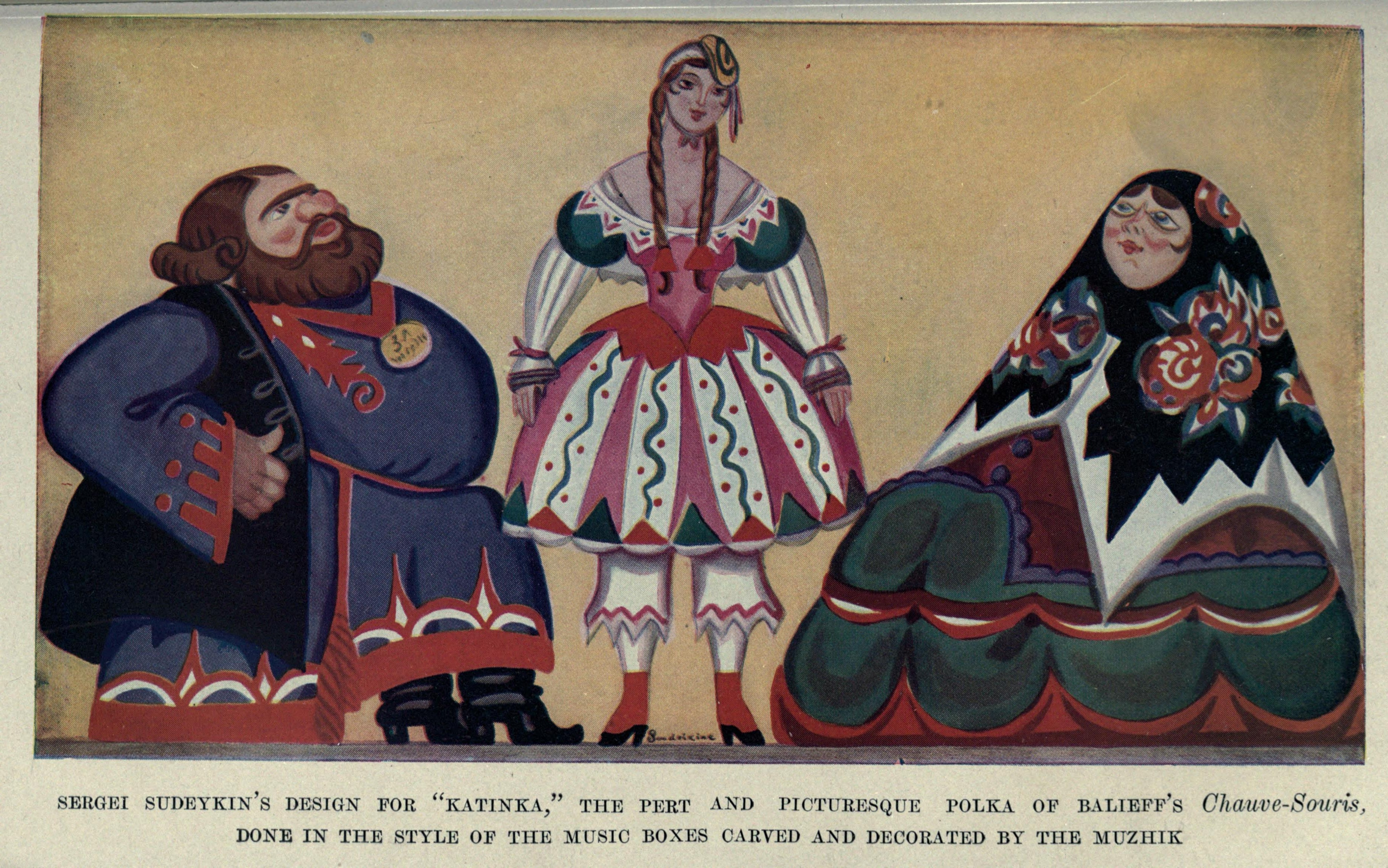
A design done by Sudeikin.

In 1926 he prepared artwork for the 1926 Broadway production of Nikolai Evreinov's The Chief Thing. Soudeikine later designed the settings for the original Theatre Guild production of Porgy and Bess that first opened on Broadway at the Alvin Theatre in New York City on October 10, 1935.

== Selected paintings ==
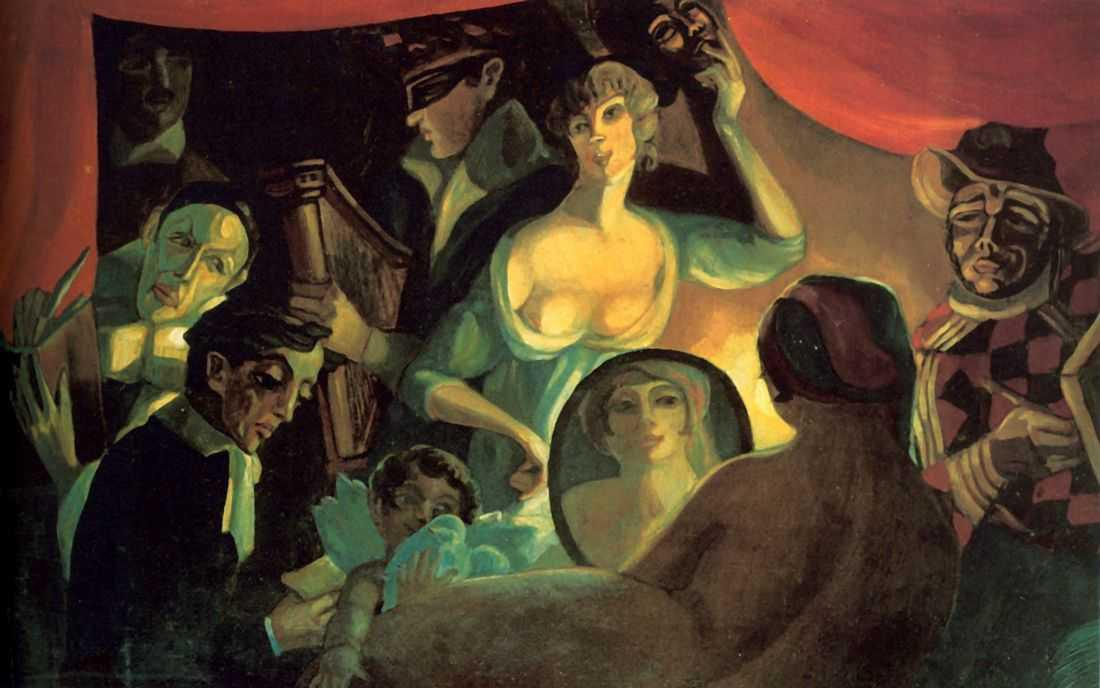
Cabaret Comedians' Rest

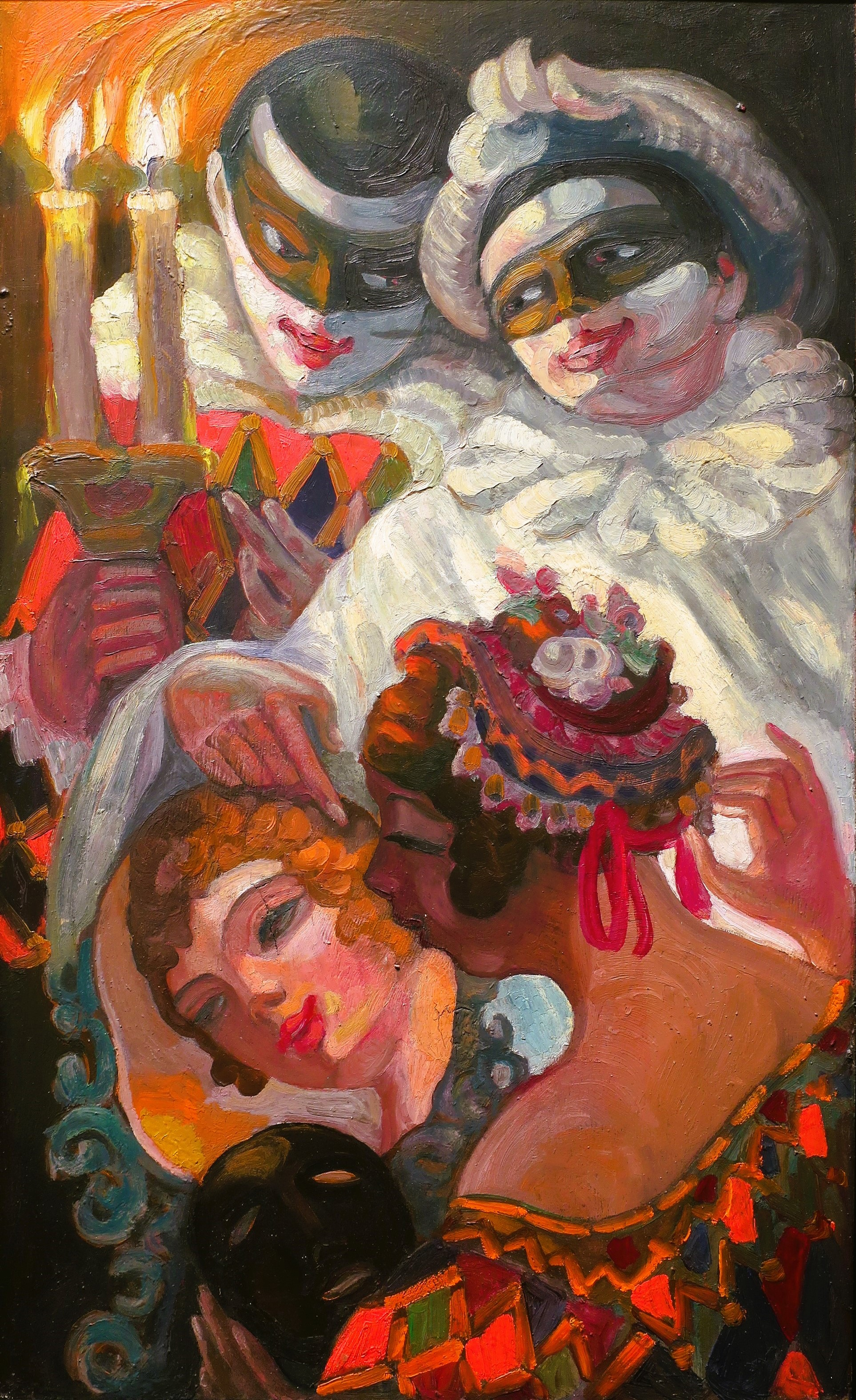
Tafel Kabarett

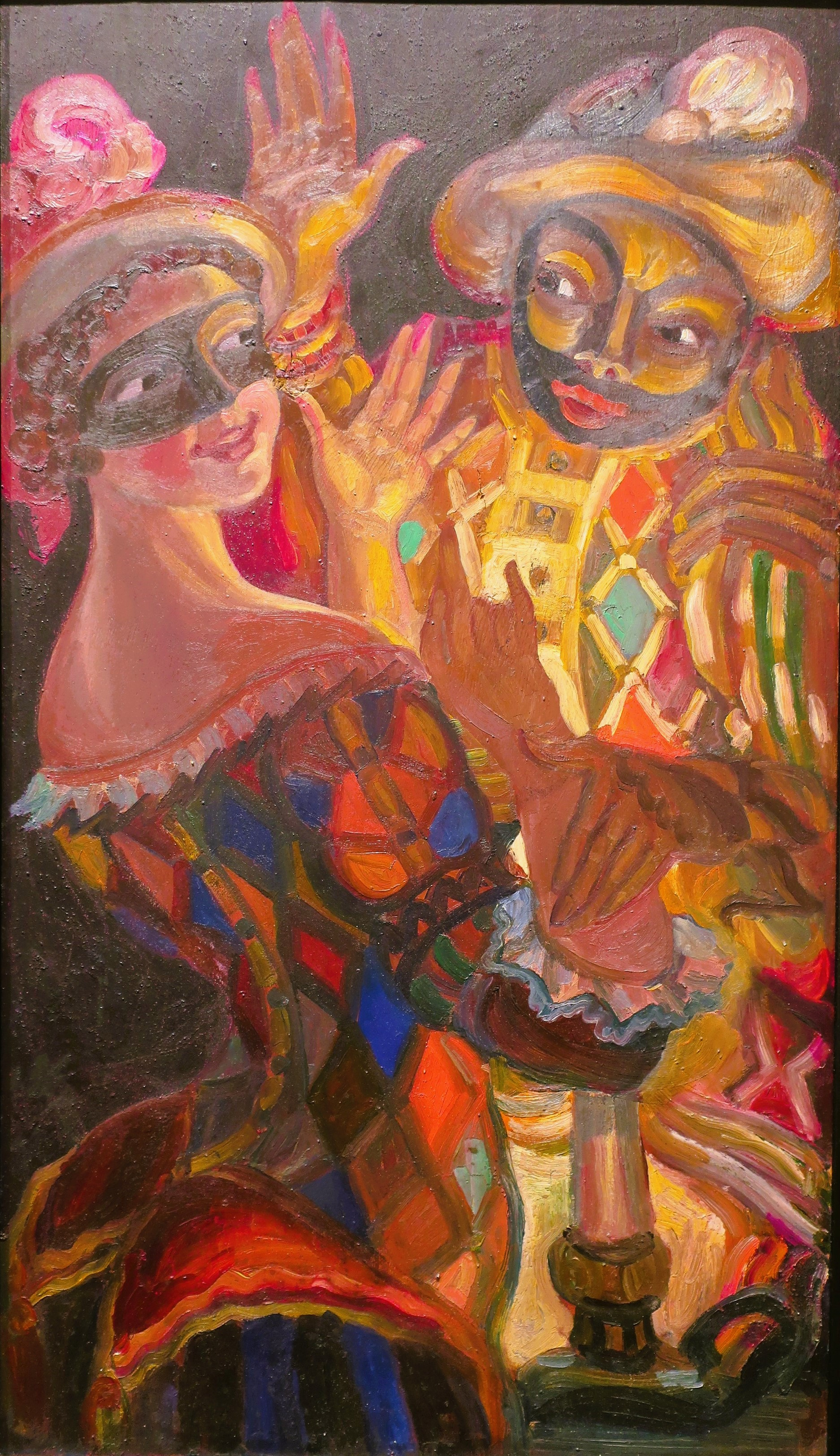
Tafel Kabarett

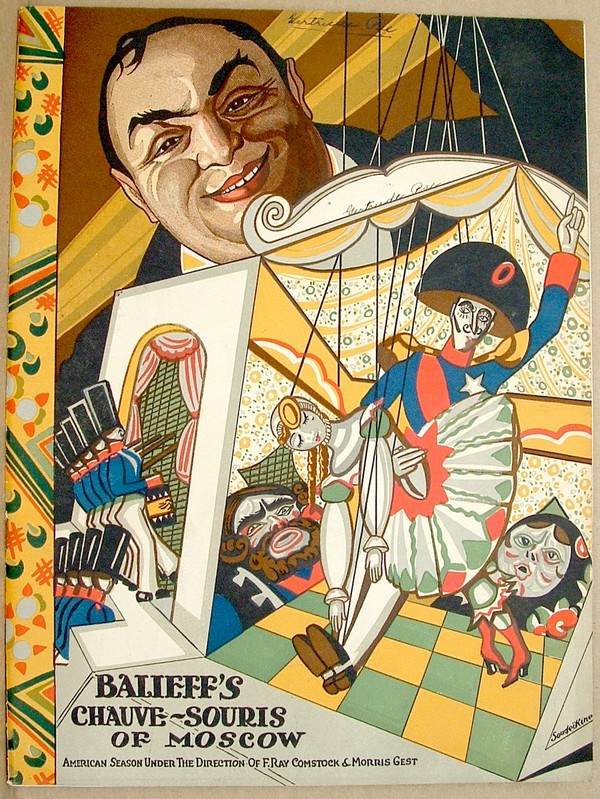
1922 program cover for US tour

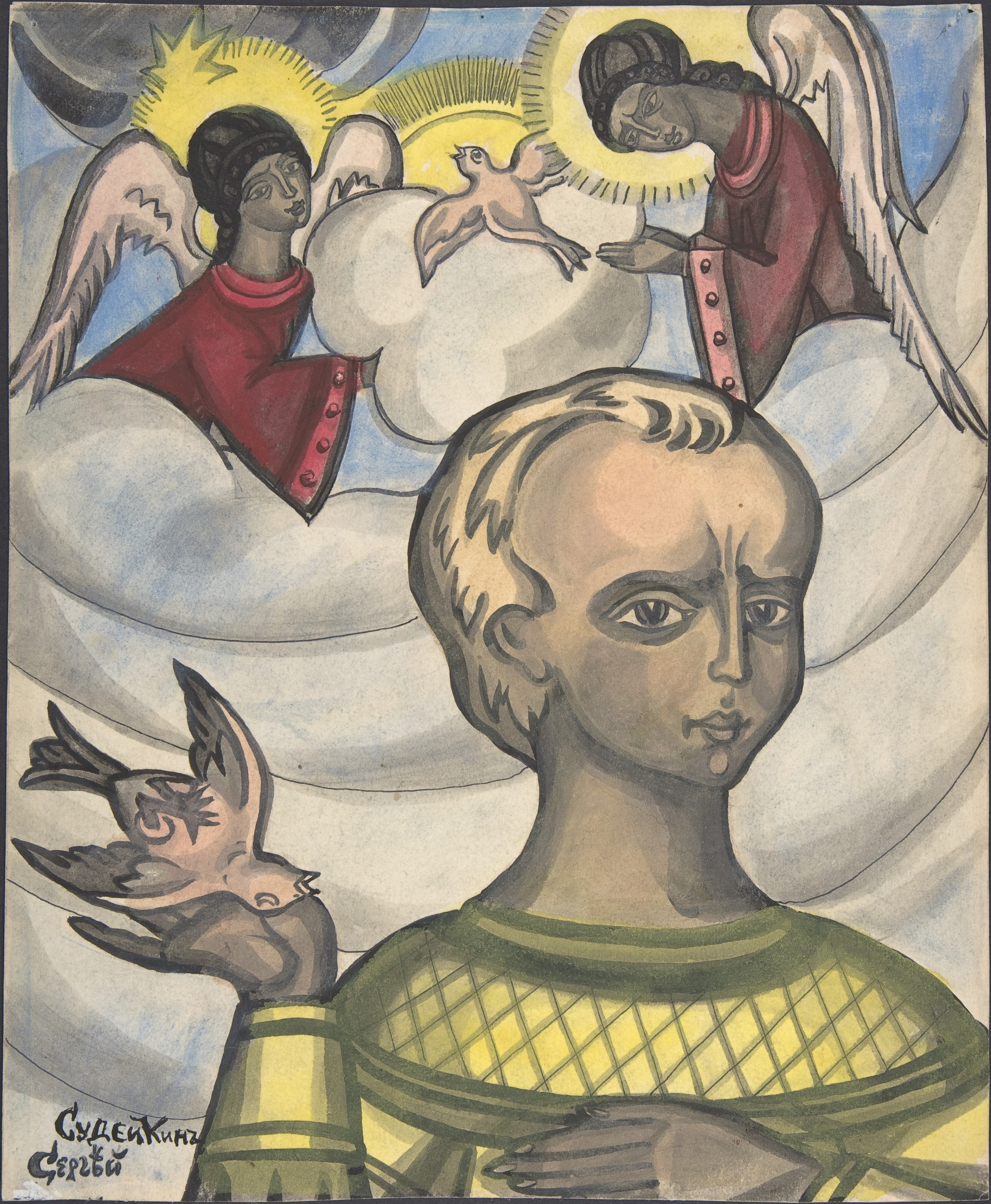
Childhood of Nikita

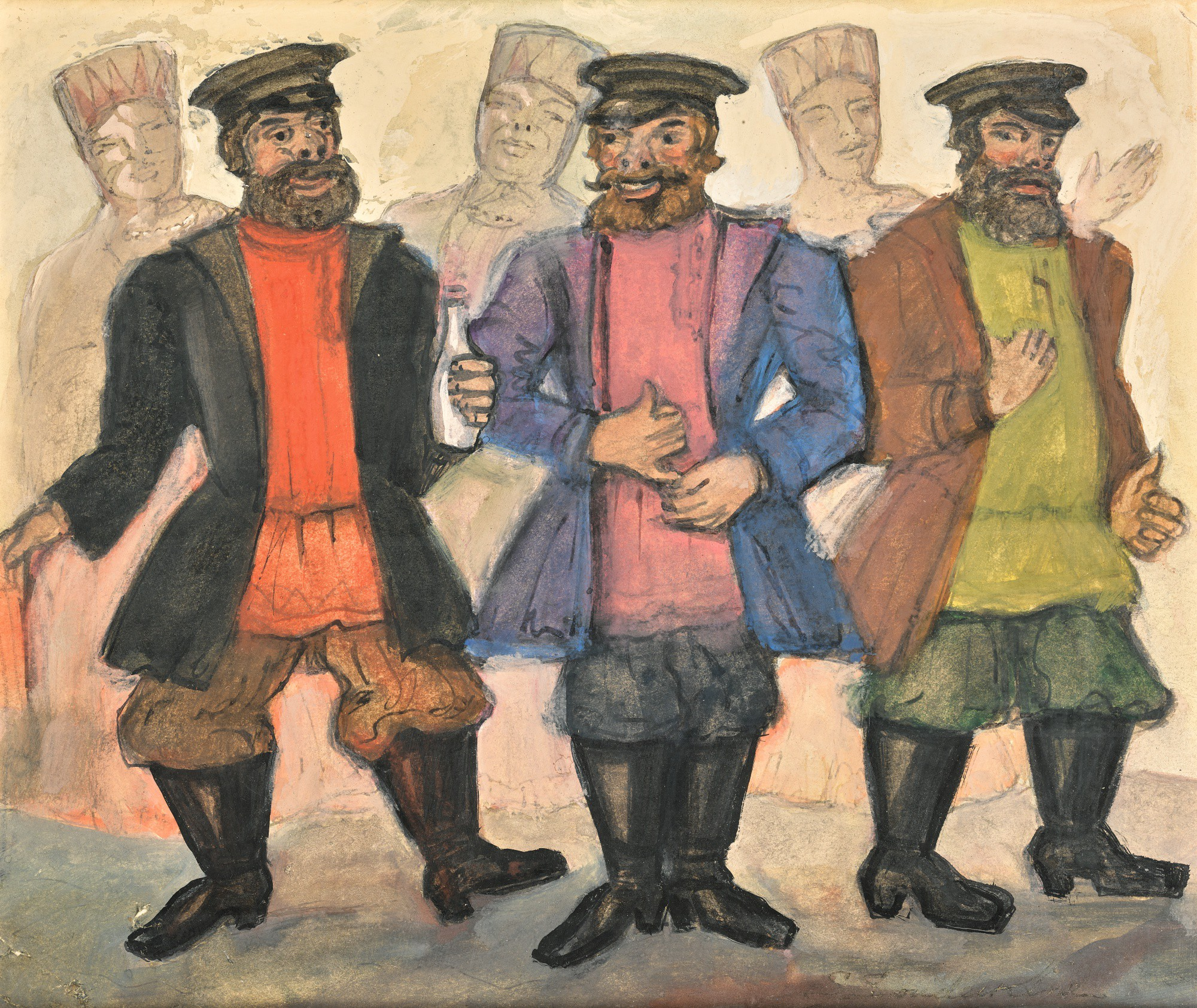
Russian Muzhiki

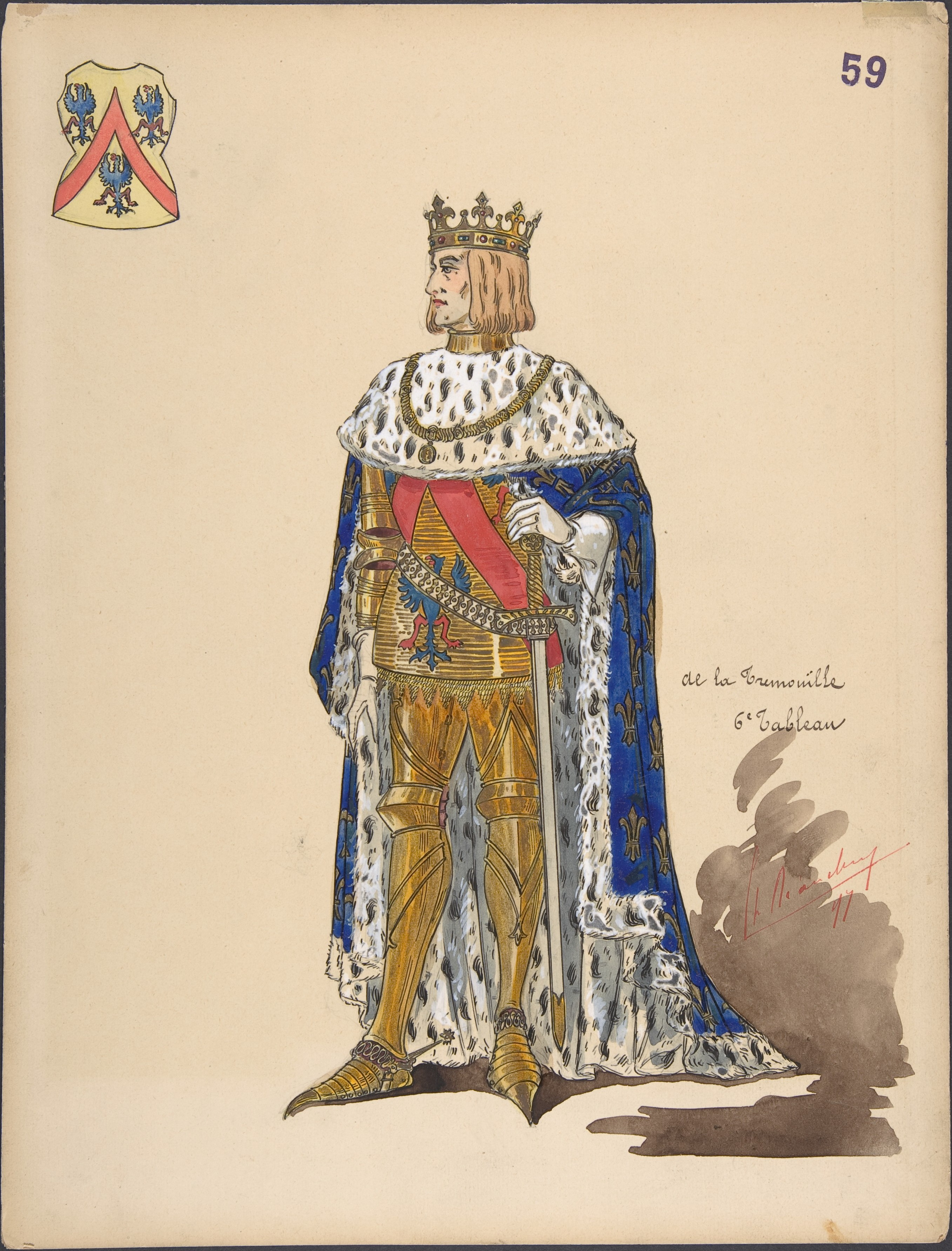
King and Coat of Arms

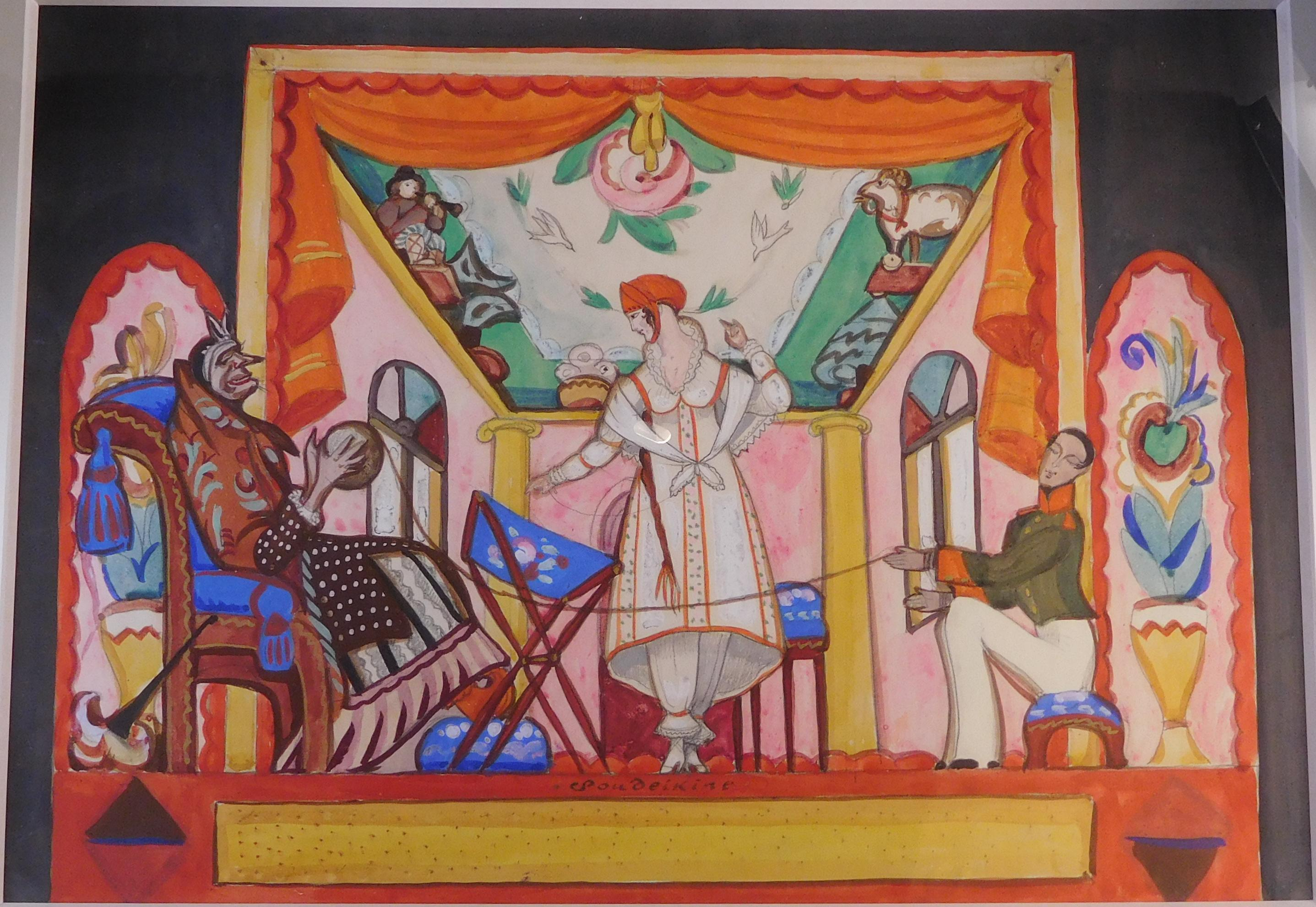
Projet de décors

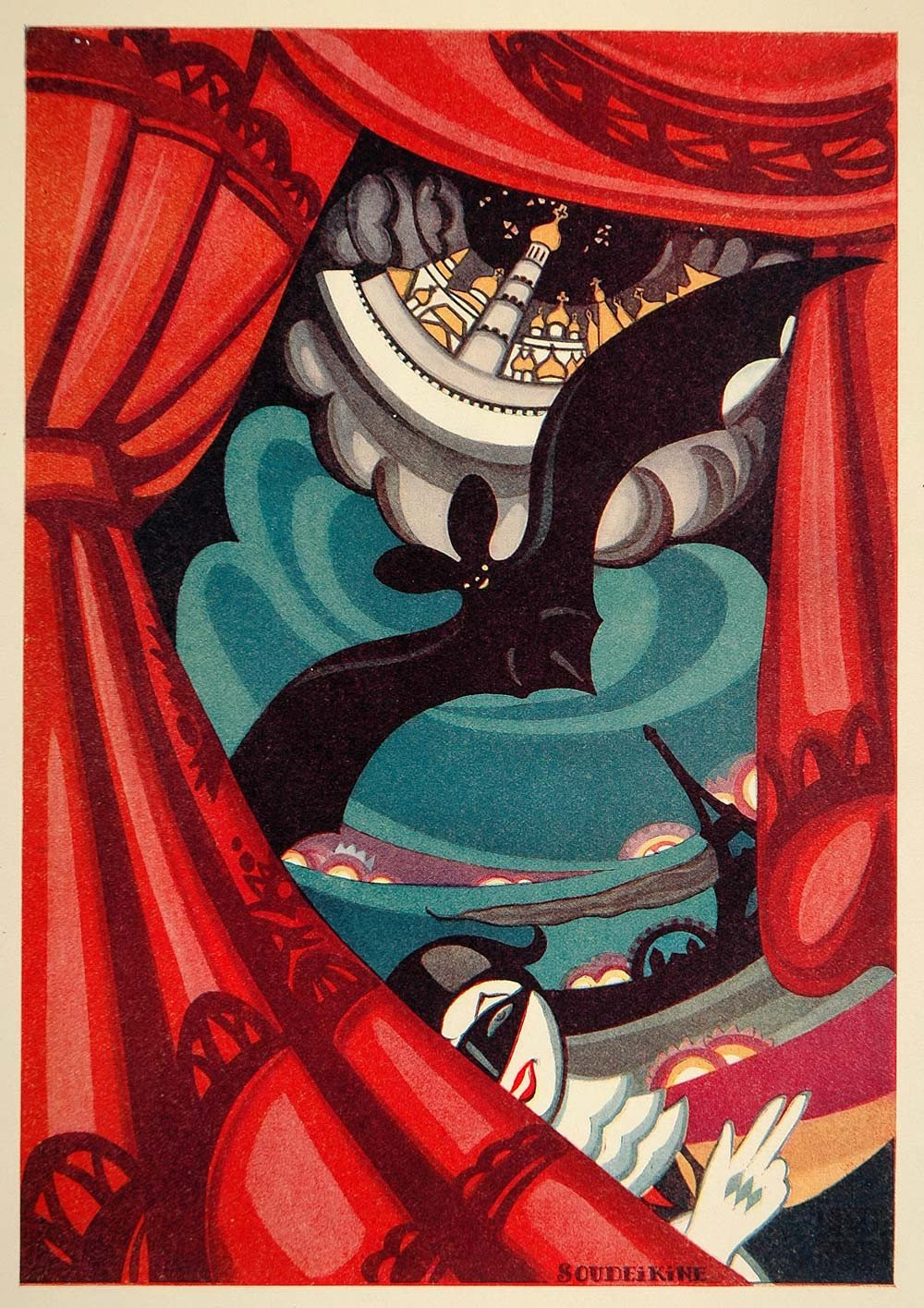
Bat Theatre in Moscow

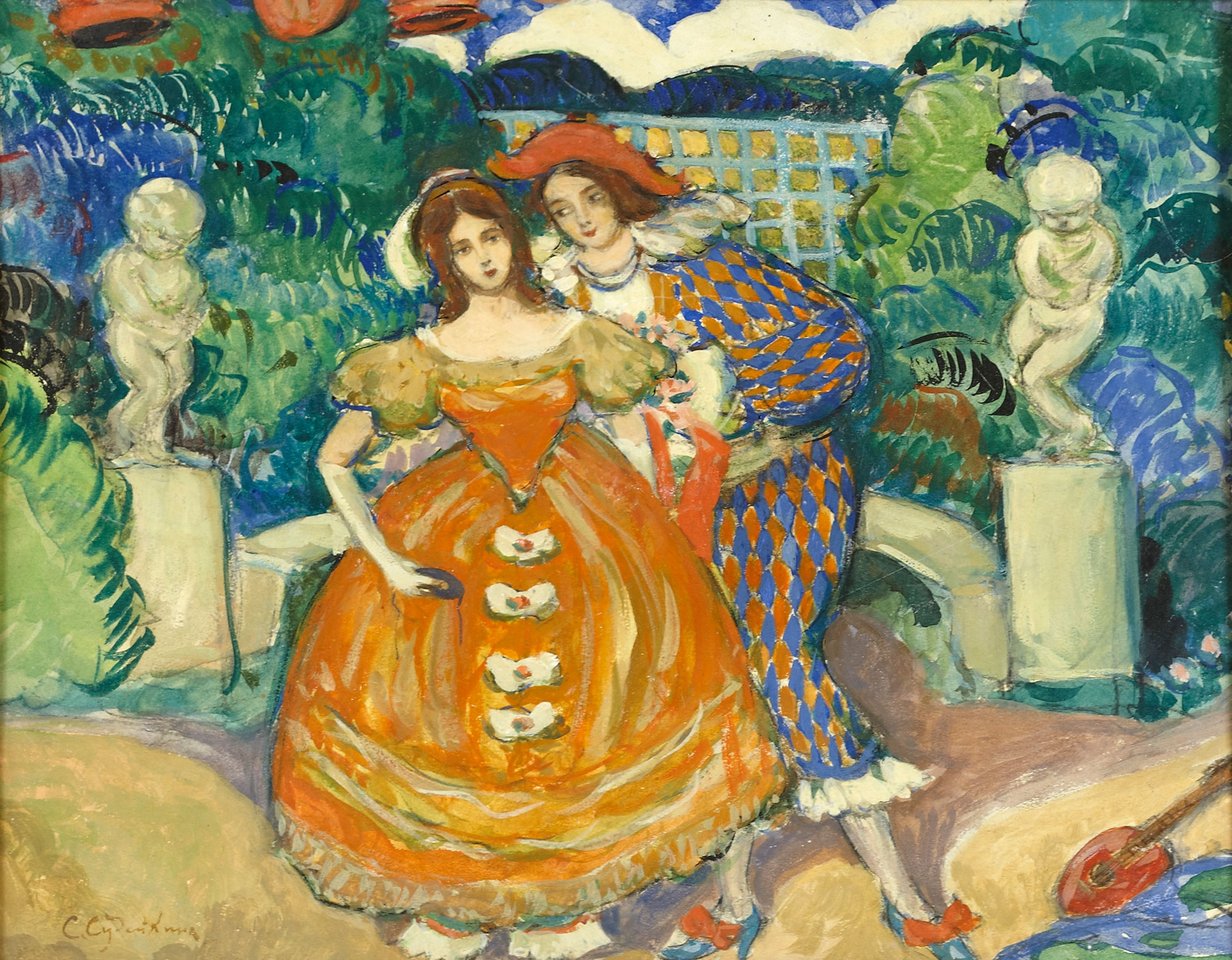
Masquerade

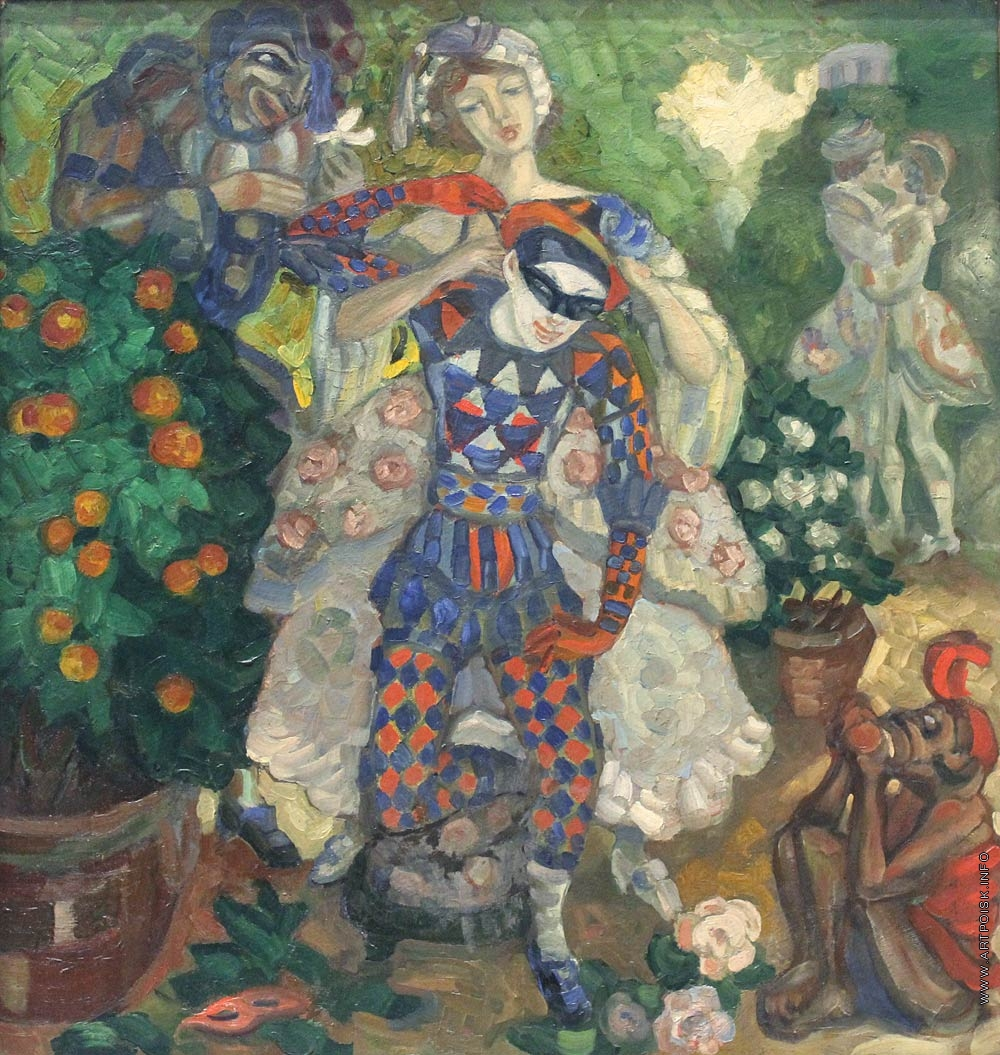
Pantomime

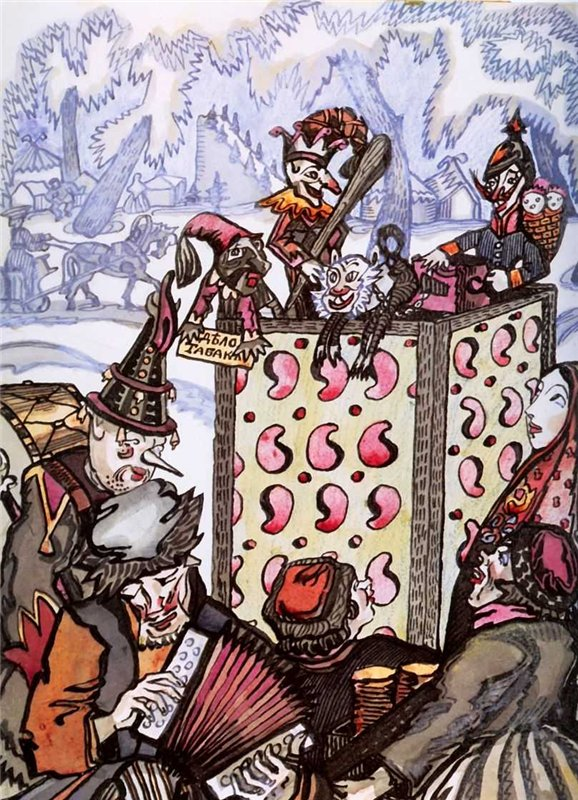
Petrushka

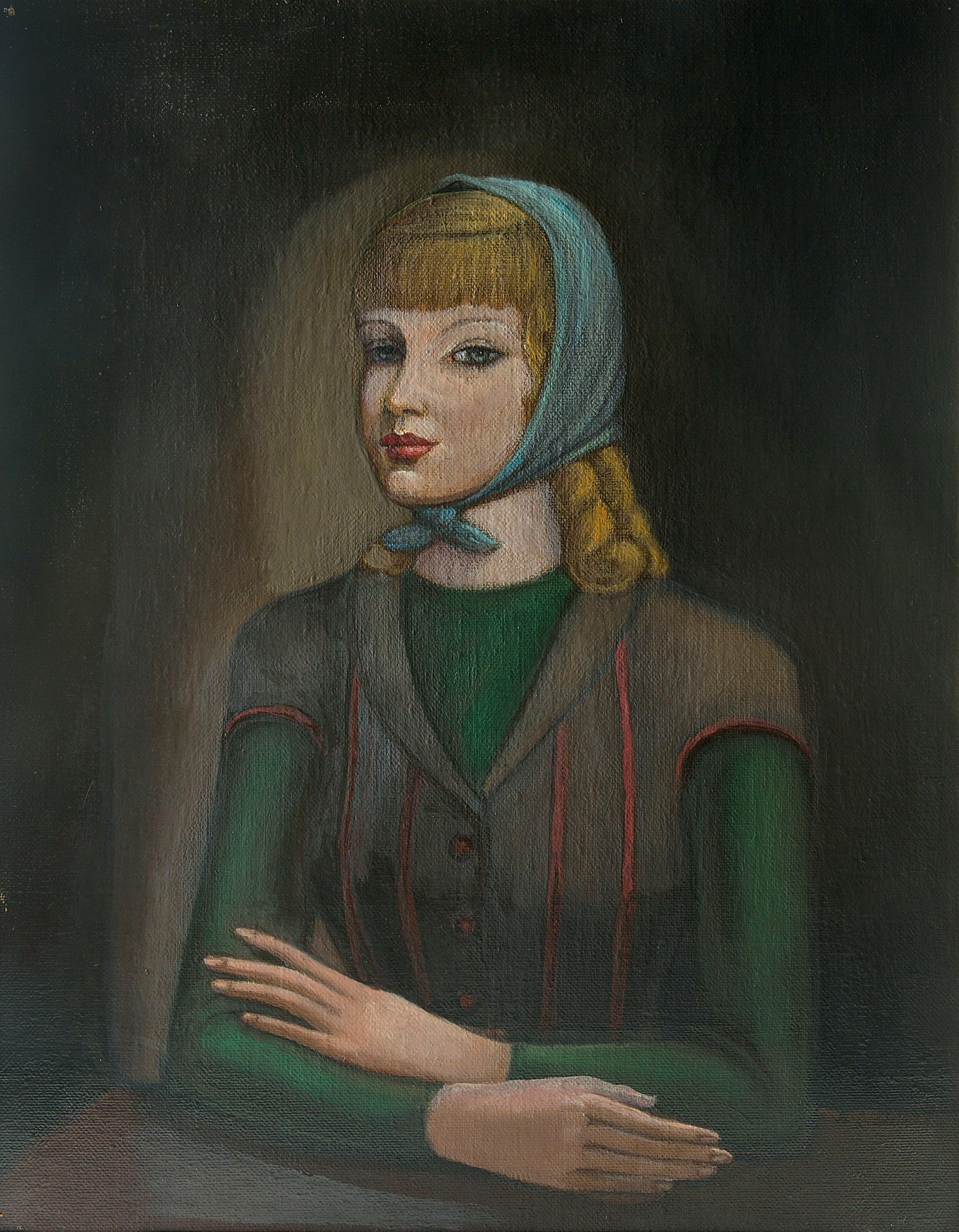
Portrait of Jeanne

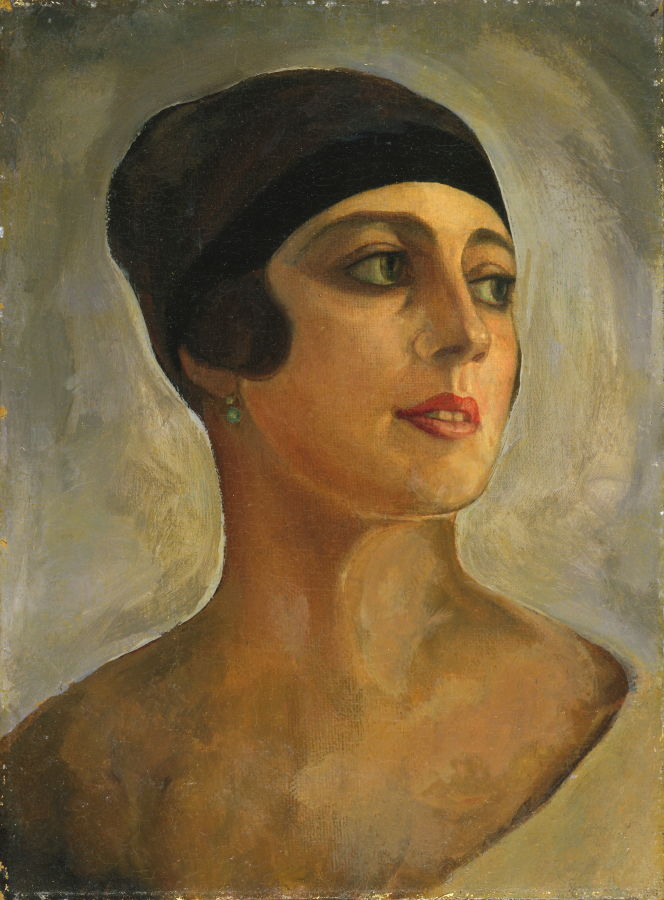
Vera Stravinsky
