= Fyodor Stravinsky =

Russian operatic bass and actor (1843–1902)

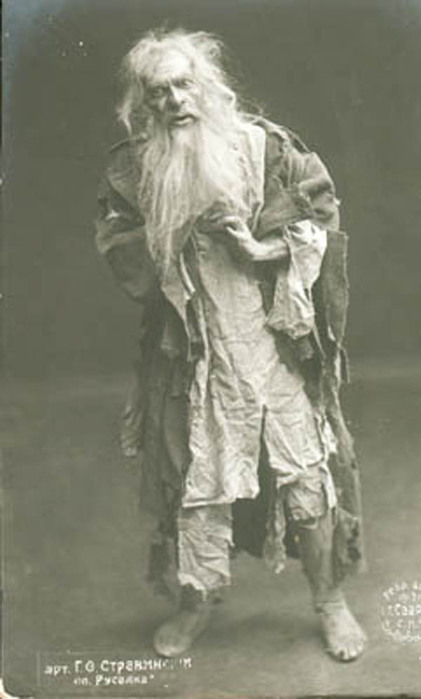
Fyodor Stravinsky as the Miller in Dargomyzhsky's opera Rusalka

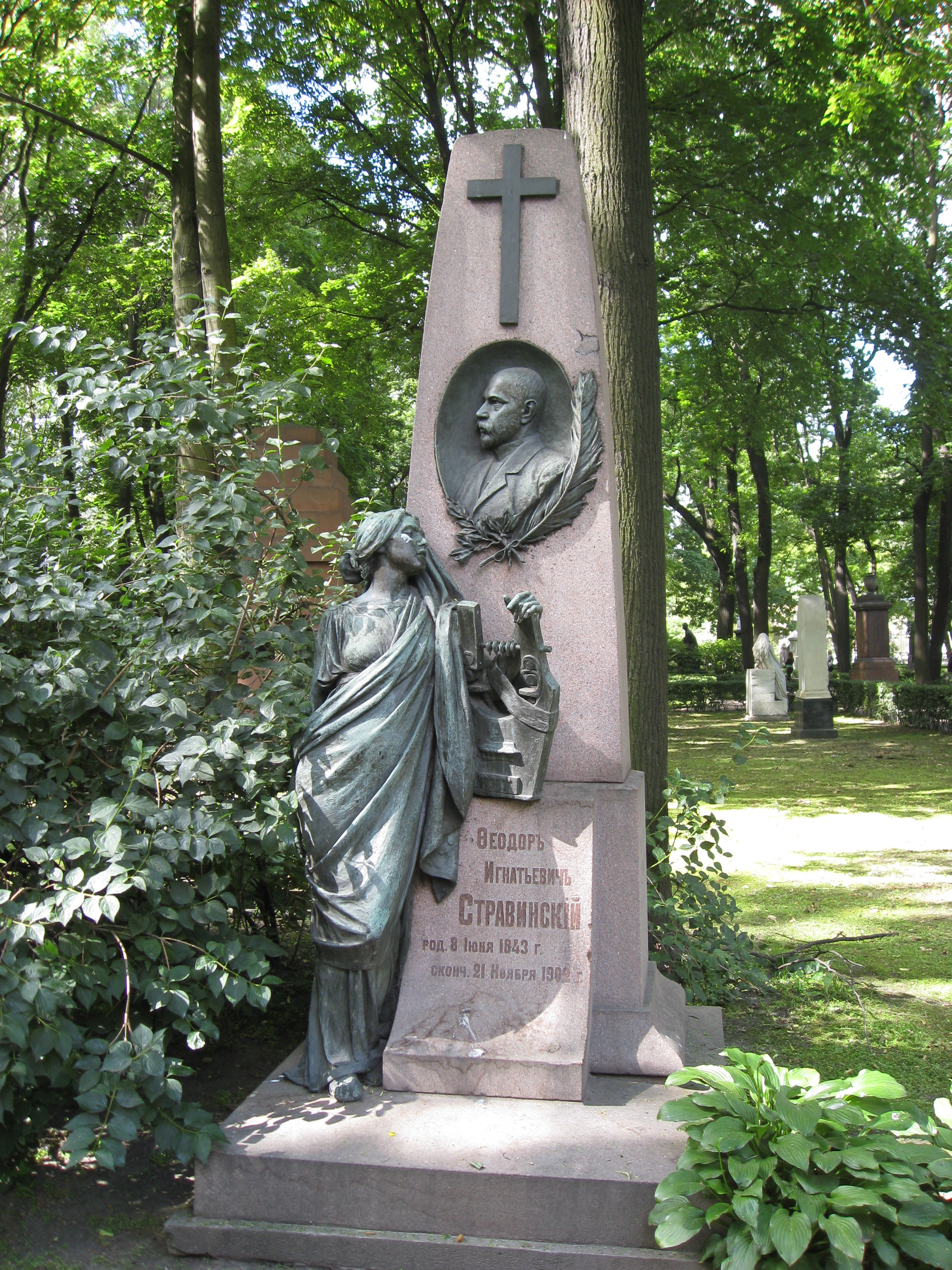
Tomb of Fyodor Stravinsky in Tikhvin Cemetery in Saint Petersburg

Fyodor Ignatyevich Stravinsky (Note: In this name that follows East Slavic naming customs, the patronymic is Ignatyevich and the family name is Stravinsky.) (Russian: Фёдор Игнатьевич Страви́нский) (20 June [O.S. 8 June] 1843, estate Novy Dvor (Aleksichi), Rechitsky Uyezd, Minsk Governorate – 4 December [O.S. 21 November] 1902) was a Russian bass singer and actor. He was the father of Igor Stravinsky and the grandfather of Théodore Strawinsky and Soulima Stravinsky.

== Life and career ==
His father Ignacy was a Catholic and came from a noble Polish family of Sulima-Strawiński (Note: According to Igor Stravinsky, the name "Stravinsky" (Polish: Strawiński) originated from "Strava" (Polish: Strawa), a small river in eastern Poland, tributary to the Vistula.); his mother, Alexandra Ivanovna Skorokhodova, was a daughter of a Russian small landowner. Fyodor was baptised in accordance with the Orthodox rite due to Imperial Law which stated that children born of mixed Catholic–Orthodox marriages had to be brought up in the Russian Orthodox faith.

In 1869 he completed his education at the Nezhin Lyceum, where he sang in the church choir. He studied voice at the Saint Petersburg Conservatory from 1869 to 1873. He later studied with Camille Everardi in Kiev.

Stravinsky started his solo singing career in Kiev, Kiev Governorate (1873–1876) before moving to Saint Petersburg, where he sang at the Mariinsky Theatre for 26 years, from 1876 to 1902. He was hailed as the successor to Osip Petrov, he was renowned for his outstanding dramatic talent as an actor, and he was considered the leading bass at the Imperial Opera. He was admired for the depths of his psychological insights and his mastery of stagecraft.

Stravinsky created a number of roles in operas by Tchaikovsky:

- His Royal Highness in Vakula the Smith in 1876
- Dunois in The Maid of Orleans in 1881
- Mamirov in The Enchantress in 1887.

He also appeared in the premiere performance of Nikolai Soloviev's Cordelia (24 November 1880, St. Petersburg), and created the role of Moroz (King Frost) in Rimsky-Korsakov's opera The Snow Maiden (1882; his son Igor studied under Rimsky-Korsakov).

Stravinsky was also known as an active advocate of the music by Ukrainian composer Mykola Lysenko, often performing the role of Mykola in the opera Natalka Poltavka. Fyodor also posed as a Ukrainian Cossack for Ilya Repin's famous painting Reply of the Zaporozhian Cossacks to Sultan Mehmed IV of the Ottoman Empire.

He was a devotee of Ukrainian poet Taras Shevchenko and collected his books and publications, many of which he knew by heart. He had a large book collection of other Ukrainian writers such as G. Kvitka-Osnovianenko, I. Kotliarevsky, and P. Kulish.

Among his great successors were Feodor Chaliapin and Lev Sibiriakov. Fyodor Stravinsky died in 1902 and was buried in the Artist's Cemetery in the Alexander Nevsky Monastery in Saint Petersburg.

His memoirs are said to be invaluable. He also had a unique library which was very popular among bibliophiles.
