= List of compositions by Igor Stravinsky =

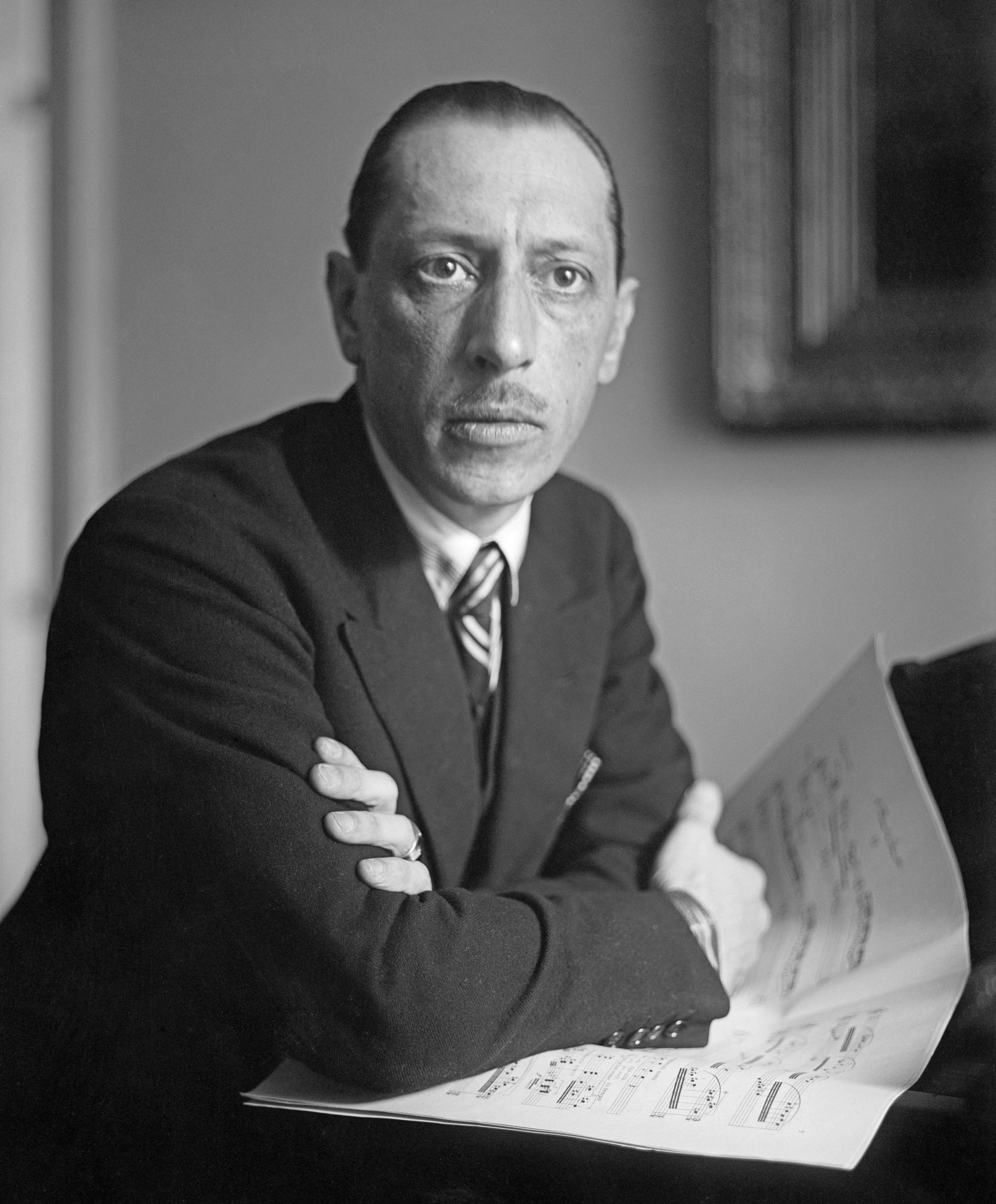
Igor Stravinsky around 1925

Igor Stravinsky was a Russian composer, pianist, and conductor known for being one of the most important and influential figures in twentieth-century classical music. His unique approach to rhythm, instrumentation, and tonality made him a pivotal figure in modernist music.

Stravinsky studied composition under composer Nikolai Rimsky-Korsakov from 1902 to 1908, Stravinsky's Feu d'artifice being his last piece composed under Rimsky-Korsakov. During this time, Stravinsky completed his first full composition, the Symphony in E♭ major, catalogued Op. 1. Attending the premiere of Stravinsky's Scherzo fantastique and Feu d'artifice in 1909 was the Russian impresario Sergei Diaghilev, owner of the Ballets Russes ballet company. Diaghilev was impressed enough that he commissioned Stravinsky to write some arrangements for the 1909 ballet season. In the following years, Diaghilev commissioned Stravinsky to write three ballets: The Firebird (1910), Petrushka (1911), and The Rite of Spring (1913). These ballets remain Stravinsky's most famous works today.

Stravinsky's music is typically divided into three style periods: the Russian period (c. 1907–1919), the neoclassical period (c. 1920–1954), and the serial period (1954–1968). Stravinsky's Russian period is characterized by the use of Russian folk tunes and the influence of Rimsky-Korsakov, Tchaikovsky, Glazunov, and Taneyev. His neoclassical period reflected back to the techniques and themes of the Classical period, like his use of the sonata form in the first movement of his Octet (1923) and the Greek mythological themes in Apollo (1928), Perséphone (1933), and Orpheus (1947). His serial period began with using Schoenberg's twelve-tone technique dodecaphony in Agon (1954–57), later experimenting with non-twelve-tone techniques in his Cantata (1952) and Septet (1953).

== List organization ==
This list is sorted by numbers assigned to Stravinsky's works in Helmut Kirchmeyer's K Catalog. The Kirchmeyer-Verzeichnis (shortened as "K") Catalog is an annotated catalog of works by Stravinsky, started in the 1950s originally placed in appendixes of other works about Stravinsky. The first edition of the catalog was published in 2002. The Kirchmayer catalogue and Köchel catalogue of W.A. Mozart's works both use "K" as an abbreviation; the difference is that Köchel uses a K followed by a period then space (e.g. K. 492) while Kirchmeyer uses no period and no space (e.g. K013). Additionally, works marked with "KN" (e.g. KN01) were added after the publishing of the first edition. The opus numbers are according to what Stravinsky marked on the music. The works are named according to the K Catalog. Other sources may have different titles due to Cyrillic romanization conventions.

This list contains the following information in column order from left to right: K Catalog number, opus number, name of the composition, year the composition was finished, genre, notes, and references.

== Compositions by Igor Stravinsky ==
K No.	Opus	Name	Year	Genre	Ref(s)
KN01	–	Tarantella	1898	Piano	
KN03	–	The Storm Cloud	1902	Vocal	
KN02	–	Scherzo	c. 1902	Piano	
K001	–	Piano Sonata in F♯ minor	1904	Piano	
KN04	–	Cantata for Rimsky-Korsakov's Sixtieth Birthday	1904	Choral	
KN05	–	The Mushrooms Going to War	1904	Vocal	
K003	Op. 1	Symphony in E♭ (original version)	1905	Orchestral	
KN06	–	The Driver and the Tarantula	1906	Vocal	
K002	Op. 2	Faun and Shepherdess	1906	Vocal	
K006	–	Pastorale (original version)	1907	Vocal	
K006	–	Pastorale (arranged for soprano, oboe, cor anglais, clarinet and bassoon)	1923	Vocal	
K006	–	Pastorale (arranged for violin, oboe, English horn, clarinet and bassoon)	1933	Chamber	
K006	–	Pastorale (arranged for violin and piano)	1933	Chamber	
K004	Op. 6	Two Melodies	1908	Vocal	
K005	Op. 3	Scherzo fantastique	1908	Orchestral	
K007	Op. 4	Feu d'artifice	1908	Orchestral	
K008	Op. 5	Funeral Dirge	1908	Orchestral	
K009	Op. 7	Four Studies	1908	Piano	
K010	Op. 8	The Firebird	1910	Ballet	
K010	–	The Firebird, Suite No. 1	1911	Orchestral	
K010	–	The Firebird, Suite No. 2	1919	Orchestral	
K010	–	The Firebird, Suite No. 3	1945	Orchestral	
K011	Op. 9	Two Poems by Paul Verlaine	1910	Vocal	
K011	–	Two Poems by Paul Verlaine (arranged for orchestra)	1951	Orchestral	
K012	–	Petrushka	1911	Ballet	
K012	–	Petrushka (cartoon suite)	1956	Orchestral	
K012	–	Trois mouvements de Pétrouchka	1921	Piano	
K013	–	Two Poems of Balmont	1911	Vocal	
K013	–	Two Poems of Balmont (arranged for voice and chamber orchestra)	1954	Vocal	
K014	–	The Star-Faced One	1912	Choral	
K015	–	The Rite of Spring	1913	Ballet	
K016	–	Three Japanese Lyrics	1913	Vocal	
K017	–	Three Little Songs from the Recollections of my Childhood	1913	Vocal	
K017	–	Three Little Songs from the Recollections of my Childhood (arranged for voice and small orchestra)	1930	Vocal	
K018	–	The Nightingale	1914	Opera	
K026	–	Song of the Nightingale	1917	Orchestral	
K019	–	Three Pieces for String Quartet	1914	Chamber	
K020	–	Pribaoutki	1914	Vocal	
KN12	–	Valse des Fleurs	1914	Piano	
K021	–	Three Easy Pieces	1915	Piano	
KN14	–	Souvenir d'une marche boche	1915	Piano	
K022	–	Cats Cradle Songs	1916	Vocal	
K023	–	Reynard	1916	Opera/Ballet	
K024	–	Three Tales for Children	1917	Vocal	
K025	–	Five Easy Pieces	1917	Piano	
KN16	–	A Waltz for Children	1917	Piano	
K027	–	Study for pianola	1917	Pianola	
K028	–	Four Russian Peasant Songs	1917	Choral	
KN17	–	Canon	1917	Chamber	
K040	–	Les Noces	1914–1917	Ballet	
K097	–	Berceuse	1917	Vocal	
KN19	–	Lied ohne Name (Duet for Two Bassoons)	1918	Chamber	
K029	–	Histoire du soldat	1918	Opera	
K029	–	Suite from Histoire du soldat, for violin, clarinet, and piano	1919	Chamber	
K030	–	Ragtime for 11 Instruments	1918	Chamber	
K031	–	Quatre chants russes	1919	Vocal	
K032	–	Piano-Rag-Music	1919	Piano	
K033	–	Three Pieces for Clarinet	1919	Chamber	
K034	–	Pulcinella	1920	Ballet	
K035	–	Concertino for string quartet	1920	Chamber	
K036	–	Symphonies of Wind Instruments	1920	Band	
K038	–	Suite No. 2	1921	Orchestral	
K037	–	Les cinq doigts	1921	Piano	
K039	–	Mavra	1922	Opera	
K041	–	Octet	1923	Chamber	
K042	–	Concerto for Piano and Wind Instruments	1924	Concertante	
K043	–	Piano Sonata	1924	Piano	
K044	–	Serenade in A	1925	Piano	
K046	–	Pater Noster	1926	Choral	
K047	–	Oedipus rex	1927	Opera	
K048	–	Apollo	1928	Ballet	
K049	–	Le Baiser de la fée	1928	Ballet	
K049	–	Divertimento (Suite from Le Baiser de la fée)	1934	Orchestral	
K050	–	Capriccio for Piano and Orchestra	1929	Concertante	
K051	–	Four Studies	1928	Orchestral	
K052	–	Symphony of Psalms	1930	Choral	
K053	–	Violin Concerto in D	1931	Concertante	
K054	–	Duo Concertant	1932	Chamber	
K055	–	Credo	1932	Choral	
K056	–	Perséphone	1933	Opera	
K057	–	Ave Maria	1934	Choral	
K058	–	Concerto for Two Pianos	1935	Chamber	
K059	–	Jeu de cartes	1936	Ballet	
K082	–	Preludium	1937	Band	
KN24	–	Petit ramusianum harmonique	1937	Vocal	
K060	–	Concerto in E♭ Dumbarton Oaks	1938	Concertante	
K061	–	Symphony in C	1940	Orchestral	
K062	–	Tango	1940	Piano	
K063	–	Danses concertantes	1942	Ballet	
K064	–	Circus Polka	1942	Piano	
K065	–	Four Norwegian Moods	1942	Orchestral	
K066	–	Ode	1943	Orchestral	
K068	–	Babel	1944	Choral	
K070	–	Scherzo à la russe	1944	Band	
K069	–	Scènes de ballet	1944	Ballet	
K067	–	Sonata for Two Pianos	1944	Piano	
K072	–	Elegy	1944	Chamber	
K073	–	Symphony in Three Movements	1945	Orchestral	
K074	–	Ebony Concerto	1945	Concertante	
K075	–	Concerto in D	1946	Concertante	
K071	–	Little Canon	1947	Chamber	
K076	–	Orpheus	1947	Ballet	
K077	–	Mass	1948	Choral	
K078	–	The Rake's Progress	1951	Opera	
K079	–	Cantata	1952	Choral	
K080	–	Septet	1953	Chamber	
K081	–	Three Songs from William Shakespeare	1953	Vocal	
K084	–	In Memoriam Dylan Thomas	1954	Vocal	
K085	–	Greeting Prelude	1955	Orchestral	
K086	–	Canticum Sacrum	1955	Choral	
K088	–	Agon	1957	Ballet	
K089	–	Threni	1958	Choral	
K091	–	Movements	1959	Concertante	
K090	–	Epitaphium	1959	Chamber	
K092	–	Double Canon Raoul Dufy In Memoriam	1959	Chamber	
K095	–	A Sermon, a Narrative and a Prayer	1961	Choral	
K096	–	Anthem (The Dove Descending Breaks the Air)	1962	Choral	
K098	–	The Flood	1963	Opera	
K101	–	Abraham and Isaac	1963	Vocal	
K100	–	Elegy for J.F.K.	1964	Vocal	
K102	–	Fanfare for a New Theatre	1964	Chamber	
K103	–	Variations	1964	Orchestral	
K104	–	Introitus (T. S. Eliot in Memoriam)	1965	Choral	
K106	–	Requiem Canticles	1966	Choral	
K107	–	The Owl and the Pussy Cat	1966	Vocal	

== By type of composition ==
=== Opera/theatre ===
- The Nightingale (Le Rossignol), 3-act opera (1914)
- Renard, a burlesque for 4 pantomimes and chamber orchestra (1916)
- L'Histoire du soldat (The Soldier's Tale), for chamber ensemble and three speakers (1918)
- Mavra, one-act opera (1922)
- Oedipus rex, 2-act opera-oratorio (1927)
- Perséphone, mélodrame for speaker, soloists, chorus and orchestra (1933)
- The Rake's Progress, 3-act opera (1951)
- The Flood, television opera (1962)

=== Ballet ===
- The Firebird (L'oiseau de feu) (1910; rev. 1919, 1945)
- Petrushka (1911, rev. 1947)
- The Rite of Spring (Le sacre du printemps) (1913; rev. 1947, 1967)
- Les Noces (The Wedding), for soloists, choir, four pianos and percussion (1914–17 and 1919–23)
- Pulcinella, for chamber orchestra and soloists (1920)
- Apollo (Apollon musagète), for string orchestra (1928; rev. 1947)
- Le Baiser de la fée (The Fairy's Kiss) (1928; rev. 1950)
- Jeu de cartes (Card Game) (1936)
- Circus Polka (1942)
- Scènes de ballet (1944)
- Orpheus, for chamber orchestra (1947)
- Agon (1957)

=== Orchestral ===
- Symphony in E♭ major, Op. 1 (1907)
- Scherzo fantastique, Op. 3 (1908)
- Feu d'artifice (Fireworks), Op. 4 (1908)
- Funeral Song (Погребальная песня; Chant funèbre), Op. 5 (1908); composed to commemorate the death of Nikolai Rimsky-Korsakov; premiered 17 January 1909 in the Grand Hall of the Saint Petersburg Conservatory; lost until September 2015.
- Le chant du rossignol (Song of the Nightingale) (1917)
- Suite from Pulcinella (1920; rev. 1947)
- Suite No. 2 for chamber orchestra (1921, arrangement of Trois pièces faciles and Cinq pièces faciles No. 5)
- Suite No. 1 for chamber orchestra (1925, arrangement of Cinq pièces faciles Nos. 1–4)
- Quatre études, for orchestra (1928, arrangement of Three Pieces for String Quartet and Étude pour pianola)
- Divertimento (Suite from Le Baiser de la fée, 1934)
- Preludium for Jazz Ensemble (1936/37)
- Concerto in E♭ Dumbarton Oaks, for chamber orchestra (1938)
- Symphony in C (1940)
- Danses concertantes for chamber orchestra (1941–42)
- Four Norwegian Moods (1942)
- Ode (1943)
- Scherzo à la russe for orchestra (1944, also a version for Paul Whiteman's band)
- Circus Polka (1944)
- Symphony in Three Movements (1945)
- Concerto in D "Basle", for string orchestra (1946)
- Tango for chamber orchestra (1953, arrangement of 1940 work for piano)
- Greeting Prelude for orchestra (1955), for the 80th birthday of Pierre Monteux
- 8 Instrumental Miniatures for 15 Players (1963, orchestration of Les cinq doigts)
- Variations (Aldous Huxley in Memoriam) (1963/1964)
- Canon on a Popular Russian Tune (1965)

=== Concertante ===
- Concerto for Piano and Wind Instruments (1923–24, rev. 1950)
- Capriccio for Piano and Orchestra (1929/1949)
- Violin Concerto in D (1931)
- Movements for Piano and Orchestra (1958/1959)

=== Choral ===
- Cantata for Rimsky-Korsakov's Sixtieth Birthday, for chorus and piano (1904). Unpublished. Performed once on 19 March 1904 at Nikolai Rimsky-Korsakov's apartment in St. Petersburg and subsequently lost.
- Zvezdoliki (Le roi des étoiles) (The King of the Stars), for men's choir and orchestra (1912)
- Four Russian Peasant Songs, for female voice unaccompanied (1917)
- Pater Noster (Otche Nash) for chorus a cappella (1926, rev. 1949)
- Symphony of Psalms, for chorus and orchestra (1930, rev. 1948)
- Credo (Veruyu) for chorus a cappella (1932, rev. 1964)
- Ave Maria (Bogoroditse Dyevo) for chorus a cappella (1934, rev. 1949)
- Babel (1944)
- Mass, for chorus and double wind quintet (1944–48)
- Cantata, for mezzo-soprano, tenor, female chorus, 2 flutes, oboe, English horn, and cello (1951–52)
- Canticum Sacrum, for tenor, baritone, chorus, and orchestra (1955)
- Threni, for six soloists, chorus, and orchestra (1958)
- A Sermon, a Narrative and a Prayer for alto, tenor, speaker, chorus, and orchestra (1961)
- Anthem (The dove descending breaks the air), for chorus a cappella (1962)
- Introitus, for men's chorus and chamber ensemble (1965)
- Requiem Canticles, for bass, contralto, chorus, and orchestra (1966)

=== Vocal ===
- Le Nuage (Туча; Storm-Cloud), for voice and piano (1902)
- The Mushrooms Going to War, for voice (bass) and piano (1904)
- Conductor and Tarantula, for voice and piano (1906) Lost.
- Faun and Shepherdess, for mezzo-soprano and orchestra, Op. 2 (1907)
- Pastorale, for vocalise soprano and piano (1907)
  - Stravinsky created an arrangement of this piece for soprano and four woodwinds in 1923, and arrangements for violin and piano and for violin and four woodwinds in 1933.
- Two Melodies of Gorodetsky, for mezzo-soprano and piano, Op. 6 (1908)
- Deux poèmes de Paul Verlaine, for baritone and piano, Op. 9 (1910, arranged for baritone and orchestra 1951)
- Two Poems of K. Balmont, for voice and piano (1911, arranged for voice and small orchestra 1954)
- Three Japanese Lyrics (Trois poésies de la lyrique japonaise), for voice and piano or chamber orchestra (1913)
- Trois petites chansons, for voice and piano (1906–1913, arranged for voice and small orchestra 1930)
- Pribaoutki, for voice, four woodwinds, and four strings (1914)
  - Kornílo (Uncle Kornilo)
  - Natashka (Little Natalie)
  - Polkovnik (The Colonel)
  - Starets i zayats (The Old Man and the Hare)
- Berceuses du chat, for contralto and three clarinets (1916)
- Three Tales for Children, for voice and piano (1917)
  - Tilim-bom
  - Geese, Swans
  - The bear's little song
- Berceuse, for voice and piano (1918)
- Quatre chants russes, for voice and piano (1918–19)
  - Selezen’ (The Drake)
  - Zapevnaya (Counting Song)
  - Sidit varabey na chuzhoy garadbe (Dish-divination Song)
  - Sektanskaya (Song of the Sectarian)
- Petit ramusianum harmonique, for single voice or voices (1938)
- Three Songs from William Shakespeare, for mezzo-soprano, flute, clarinet, and viola (1953)
- Four Songs, for mezzo-soprano, flute, harp and guitar (1954, arrangement of Quatre chants russes Nos. 1 & 4; Three Tales for Children Nos. 1 & 2)
- In Memoriam Dylan Thomas (Dirge-canons and song), for tenor, string quartet, and four trombones (1954)
- Abraham and Isaac, a sacred ballad for baritone and orchestra (1963)
- Elegy for J.F.K., for baritone or mezzo-soprano and three clarinets (1964)
- "The Owl and the Pussy Cat", for soprano and piano (1966)

=== Chamber ===
- Three Pieces for String Quartet (1914)
- Pour Pablo Picasso, for solo clarinet (1917) Unpublished.
- Canon for Two Horns (1917) Unpublished.
- Ragtime for Eleven Instruments (1917–18)
- Lied ohne Name (Duet for Two Bassoons) (1918)
- Suite from L'Histoire du soldat, for violin, clarinet, and piano (1919)
- Three Pieces for Clarinet (1919)
- Concertino, for string quartet (1920)
- Symphonies of Wind Instruments (1920, rev. 1947)
- Octet for Wind Instruments (1923)
- Suite on themes, fragments and pieces by Giambattista Pergolesi, for violin and piano (1925)
- Duo Concertant for Violin and Piano (1932)
- Suite italienne (from Pulcinella), for cello and piano (1932/33) (in collaboration with Gregor Piatigorsky)
- Suite italienne (from Pulcinella), for violin and piano (1934) (in collaboration with Samuel Dushkin)
- Elegy, for solo viola (1944)
- Ebony Concerto for clarinet and jazz band (1945)
- Septet for clarinet, horn, bassoon, violin, viola, cello, and piano (1953)
- Concertino, for small ensemble (1953) (arrangement of 1920 work for string quartet)
- Epitaphium, for flute, clarinet and harp (1959)
- Double Canon, for string quartet 'Raoul Dufy in Memoriam' (1959)
- Monumentum pro Gesualdo di Venosa ad CD annum, for chamber ensemble (1960)
1. "Asciugate I begli ochi"
2. "Ma tu, cagion di quella"
3. "Belta poi che t'assenti"
- Lullaby, for two recorders (1960) (arrangement of item from The Rake's Progress, 1951)
- Fanfare for a New Theatre, for two trumpets (1964)

=== Piano ===
- "Tarantella" (1898)
- Storm-Cloud (Le Nuage) (1898) Lost.
- Scherzo (1902)
- Piano Sonata in F♯ minor (1904)
- Quatre études, Op. 7 (1908)
- The Firebird (L'oiseau de feu) (1910)
- Petrushka, reduction for piano duet (1912, rev. 1947)
- The Rite of Spring (Le sacre du printemps), for four hands (1913)
- Valse des fleurs, for two pianos (1914)
- Polka (1915)
- Valse (1915)
- Trois pièces faciles, for four hands (1915)
- Souvenir d’une marche boche (1915)
- Cinq pièces faciles, for four hands (1917)
- Valse pour les enfants (Une valse pour les petits lecteurs du Figaro) (1917)
- Ragtime, arrangement for piano solo (1919)
- Piano-Rag-Music (1919)
- Fragment des symphonies pour instruments à vent à la mémoire de Achille-Claude Debussy (1920)
- Chorale (1920)
- Les cinq doigts (1921)
- Trois mouvements de Petrouchka (1921)
- Piano Sonata (1924)
- Serenade in A (1925)
- Le chant du rossignol, arrangement for piano (1927)
- Apollon musagète (1927), transcribed for the piano by the author from the version for string orchestra completed in January 1928
- Concerto for Two Pianos (1935)
- Tango (1940)
- Circus Polka (1942)
- Sonata for Two Pianos (1943)
- Scherzo à la russe, arrangement for two pianos (1944)
- Agon, reduction for two pianos by the composer (1957)
- Two Sketches for a Sonata (1968)

=== Player piano ===
This is not a list of all piano rolls of Stravinsky's music, but only of those the composer himself composed or re-wrote for player piano. The dates are of publication.

- Étude pour pianola (Study for Pianola) – Aeolian Company, London, Themodist T967 (1921)
- Pulcinella Pleyel, Paris, Pleyela 8421 – 8428 (1921)
- The Rite of Spring (Le sacre du printemps) – Pleyel, Paris, Pleyela 8429 – 8437 (1921)
- The Rite of Spring (Le sacre du printemps) – Aeolian Company, London, Themodist T24150 – T24153 (1921)
- Piano-Rag-Music – Pleyel, Paris, Pleyela 8438 (1921)
- Ragtime – Pleyel, Paris, Pleyela 8450 (1921)
- Petrushka – Pleyel, Paris, Pleyela 8441 – 8447 (1922)
- Le chant du rossignol (Song of the Nightingale) – Pleyel, Paris, Pleyela 8451 – 8453 (1922/3)
- Three Tales for Children – Pleyel, Paris, Pleyela 8454 (1922/3)
- Quatre chants russes (Four Russian Songs) – Pleyel, Paris, Pleyela 8455 (1922/3)
- Concertino – Pleyel, Paris, Pleyela 8456 (1923)
- Les Noces (The Wedding) – Pleyel, Paris 8831 – 8834, 8861 (1923)
- The Firebird (L'oiseau de feu) – Pleyel, Paris, Pleyela 10039 – 10045 (1926)
- The Firebird (L'oiseau de feu) – Aeolian Company, London, Duo-Art D759 – D769 (1929)

=== Arrangements and transcriptions ===
- Les Sylphides (After Chopin) (1909)
- Song of the Volga Boatmen (1917)
- Chorus from the Prologue to 'Boris Godunov' (1918)
- Marseillaise (1919) for solo violin
- The Star-Spangled Banner (1941)
- Bluebird Pas de Deux, from Pyotr Ilyich Tchaikovsky (1941)
- Canzonetta Jean Sibelius (1963)
- Two Sacred Songs from Hugo Wolf's Spanisches Liederbuch (1968)
- Four Preludes and Fugues from Bach's The Well-Tempered Clavier (1969)

=== Ballets to the music of Stravinsky ===
- Danses concertantes
- The Cage (1951) to the Concerto in D
- Octet (1958) to the Octet
- Monumentum pro Gesualdo (1960) to the Monumentum pro Gesualdo di Venosa ad CD annum
- Arcade (1963) to the Concerto for Piano and Wind Instruments
- Requiem Canticles (Robbins) (1966) to the Requiem Canticles
- Variations (1966) to the Variations
- Requiem Canticles (Balanchine) (1968) to the Requiem Canticles
- Ode (1972) to the Ode
- Scènes de ballet (1972) to the Scènes de ballet
- Symphony in E♭ (1972) to the Symphony in E♭
- Symphony in Three Movements (1972) to the Symphony in Three Movements
- Élégie (1982) to the Élégie for solo viola
- Noah and the Flood (1982) to The Flood
- Tango (Balanchine) (1982) to the Tango
- Tango (Martins) (1984) to the Tango
- Scènes de ballet (1999) to the Scènes de ballet
