= Three Easy Pieces =

Three Easy Pieces may refer to:

- Three Easy Pieces (album), an album by Buffalo Tom
- Three Easy Pieces (Stravinsky), a composition by Igor Stravinsky
