= Scherzo in G minor =

Scherzo in G minor may refer to:

- Scherzo in G minor, third movement of the Octet (Mendelssohn), and later orchestrated as an alternative third movement of Symphony No. 1 (Mendelssohn)
- Scherzo (Stravinsky)
