= Serenade in A major =

Serenade in A major may refer to:

- Serenade No. 2 (Brahms)
- Serenade (Stravinsky)
