= Piano Sonata in F-sharp minor =

Piano Sonata in F-sharp minor may refer to:

- Piano Sonata No. 2 (Brahms)
- Sonatine (Ravel)
- Piano Sonata in F-sharp minor, D 571 (Schubert)
- Piano Sonata No. 1 (Schumann)
- Piano Sonata No. 3 (Scriabin)
- Piano Sonata in F-sharp minor (Stravinsky)
