= Lied ohne Name =

- by Igor Stravinsky
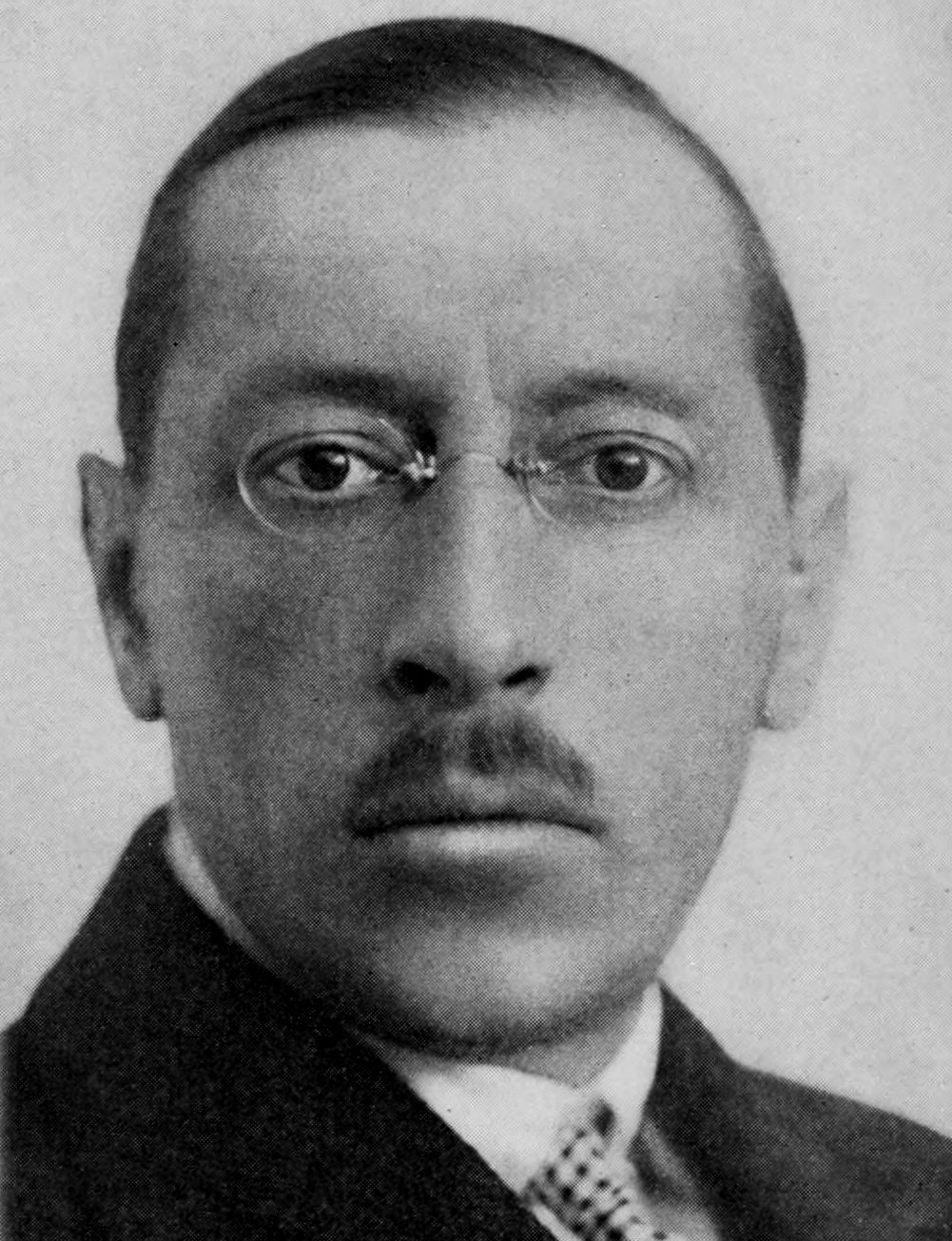
- The composer in 1921
- Composed: 1918, in Morges
- Published: 1979
- Duration: 50 seconds approximately
- Scoring: 2 bassoons

Lied ohne Name (German: Song without a Name), sometimes also entitled Lied ohne Namen (Note: Stravinsky opted for the grammatically incorrect term Lied ohne Name and referenced this title both in the manuscript and in letters to fellow musician Robert Craft. The correct term would be Lied ohne Namen.) and Duet for Two Bassons, is a composition for two bassoons by Igor Stravinsky.

== Composition ==
This short sketch was written in 1918, although some sources also mention 1917. The sketches of Lied ohne Name were found along with the sketches for Three Pieces for Solo Clarinet, whose first movement was dated October 11–14, 1918, in Morges. Since both works are notated in identical handwriting and page layout, some scholars suggest that Stravinsky worked on both pieces close to each other in the fall of 1918.

It was a composition that Stravinsky discarded and abandoned, never revisiting it again or using it as original material in other compositions. The work remained unpublished until 1979, after the composer's death, it was published in the bassoon method Learn as you Play, by Peter Wastall. It was published by Boosey & Hawkes and was reprinted again, this time separately, in 1997.

== Structure ==
This 28-bar duet has a duration of less than one minute. Unlike Fanfare for a New Theatre, this duet is one of the lesser-known miniatures by Stravinsky. Its structure is very simple and has the appearance of a sketch: no tempo indication is provided, no dynamics markings are specified anywhere in the score, and time signature changes are rare (Stravinsky changed time signatures a lot in the late 1910s, for example, in Renard and Les Noces).

The general tone of the composition is rather inexpressive and carries little emotional intent: no accent marks are provided in the score. This was probably due to the fact that Stravinsky was starting to depart from his previous style and bassoons helped him provide a "cold" sonority for his emerging objective idiom. The manuscript, which is held in Basel, included no date and was signed by Stravinsky after the final bar in Church Slavonic script.
