= Valse des fleurs (Stravinsky) =

- by Igor Stravinsky
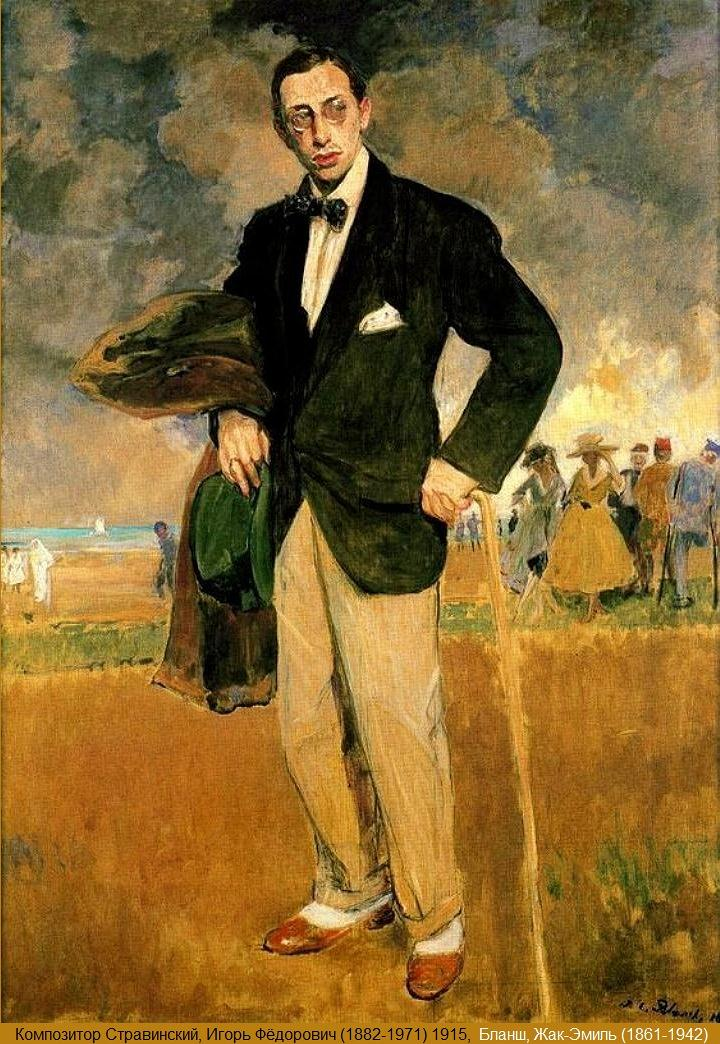
- Igor Stravinsky, in a 1915 portrait
- Native name: Цветочный вальс
- Key: C major
- Composed: 1914
- Published: Boosey & Hawkes
- Movements: 1
- Scoring: Two pianos

Premiere
- Date: February 26, 1949
- Location: New York City

Valse des fleurs (Russian: Цветочный вальс, romanized: Tsvetochny vals, lit. 'Flower Waltz') is a short composition for two pianos by Russian composer Igor Stravinsky. It was completed in 1914.

== Composition ==
Stravinsky's music post-Rite of Spring in the 1910s was devoted to Gebrauchsmusik. This example of Gebrauchsmusik was specifically conceived for educational purposes, as he was trying to produce music either for four hands or two pianos intended for himself and his son, Soulima. For this reason, the "Valse des fleurs" is generally associated with other compositions for four hands from his Swiss period, such as the Three Easy Pieces (1915) and the Five Easy Pieces (1917). The brief (less than 1 minute) "Valse pour les enfants" of 1917, though not for four hands, is also in this vein of instructionally intended pieces.

This composition was finished in Clarens, Switzerland, on August 30, 1914. Kept in the composer's personal collection, it remained unperformed and unpublished for decades after its completion. However, fellow musician Robert Craft brought it to light when Soulima and Beveridge Webster played it as part of a Stravinsky concert that he organized in New York City's Town Hall on February 26, 1949. As with most of his American works and works earlier than his American period published in the US with the express intention of making money, it was published by Boosey & Hawkes in facsimile in 1983.

== Structure ==
The "Valse des fleurs" is in one movement and has a duration of just under one minute. It is scored for two pianos and is in C major. Both melodically and structurally, it is a very simplistic piece, meant to serve as a piece for practicing piano with his five-year-old son Soulima. It spans a total of three pages, originally written in ink on 12 1/2-by-9 1/2-inch paper.
