= Quatre études, Op. 7 (Stravinsky) =

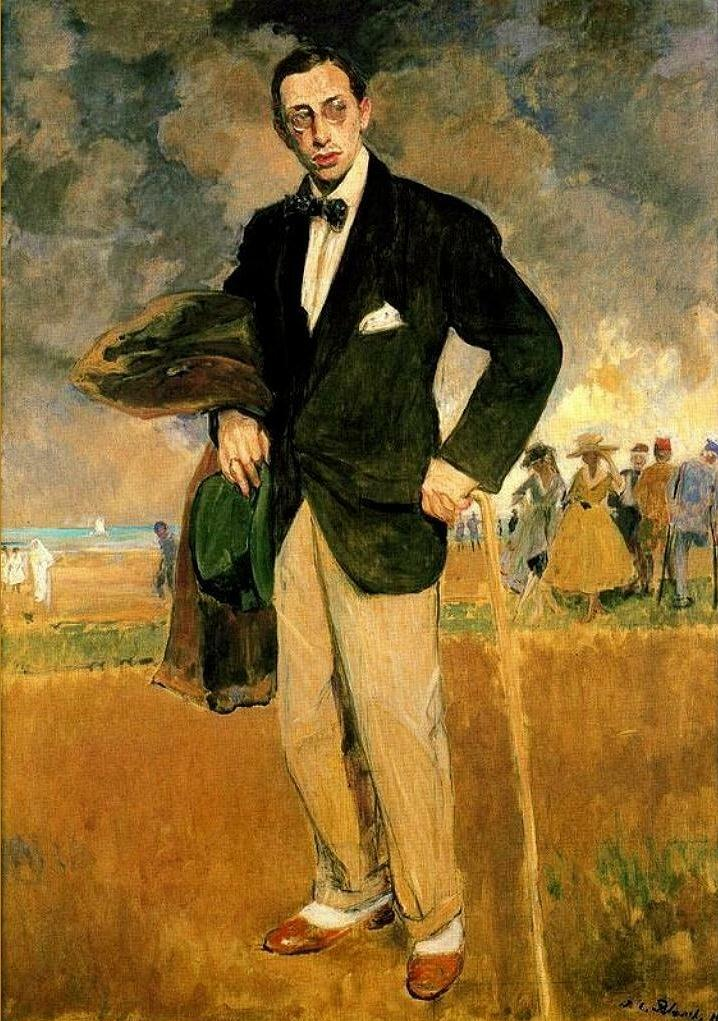
Portrait of Igor Stravinsky by Jacques-Émile Blanche (1915)

The Quatre études (Four Studies), Op. 7 are a collection of short études for piano by Igor Stravinsky. They were composed between June and July 1908 in Ustilug, Russian Empire. Along with his Piano Sonata in F♯ minor, the études are one of his major early works for piano.

== Structure ==
The four movements are listed as:

1. Con moto
2. Allegro brillante
3. Andantino
4. Vivo

These four études are focused on difficult and irregular rhythmical structures for pianists, countering tuplets with other rhythmically regular forms or other rhythmical structures that involve certain difficulty for performers.

The first étude in C minor, dedicated to Stepan Mitusov (Etienne Mitoussow), consists of a regular 2/4 with triplets against quintuplets or even septuplets at some point. The second étude in D major, dedicated to Nikolay Richter (Nicolas Richter), is in 6/8 and opposes sixteenth notes against quadruplets and quintuplets. The third in E minor, dedicated to Andrey Rimsky-Korsakov, doesn't require much effort or experience in polyrhythm, while the long legato melody is in the middle voice and the accompaniment figures are in the upper registers. The main trait of the fourth étude in F♯ major, which is dedicated to Vladimir Rimsky-Korsakov, is its syncopation, present throughout the étude.

Although much of this music is still derivative of Chopin, Scriabin, and Rachmaninoff, Stravinsky’s own voice asserts itself in the percussive final étude.
