= Babel (Stravinsky) =

- by Igor Stravinsky
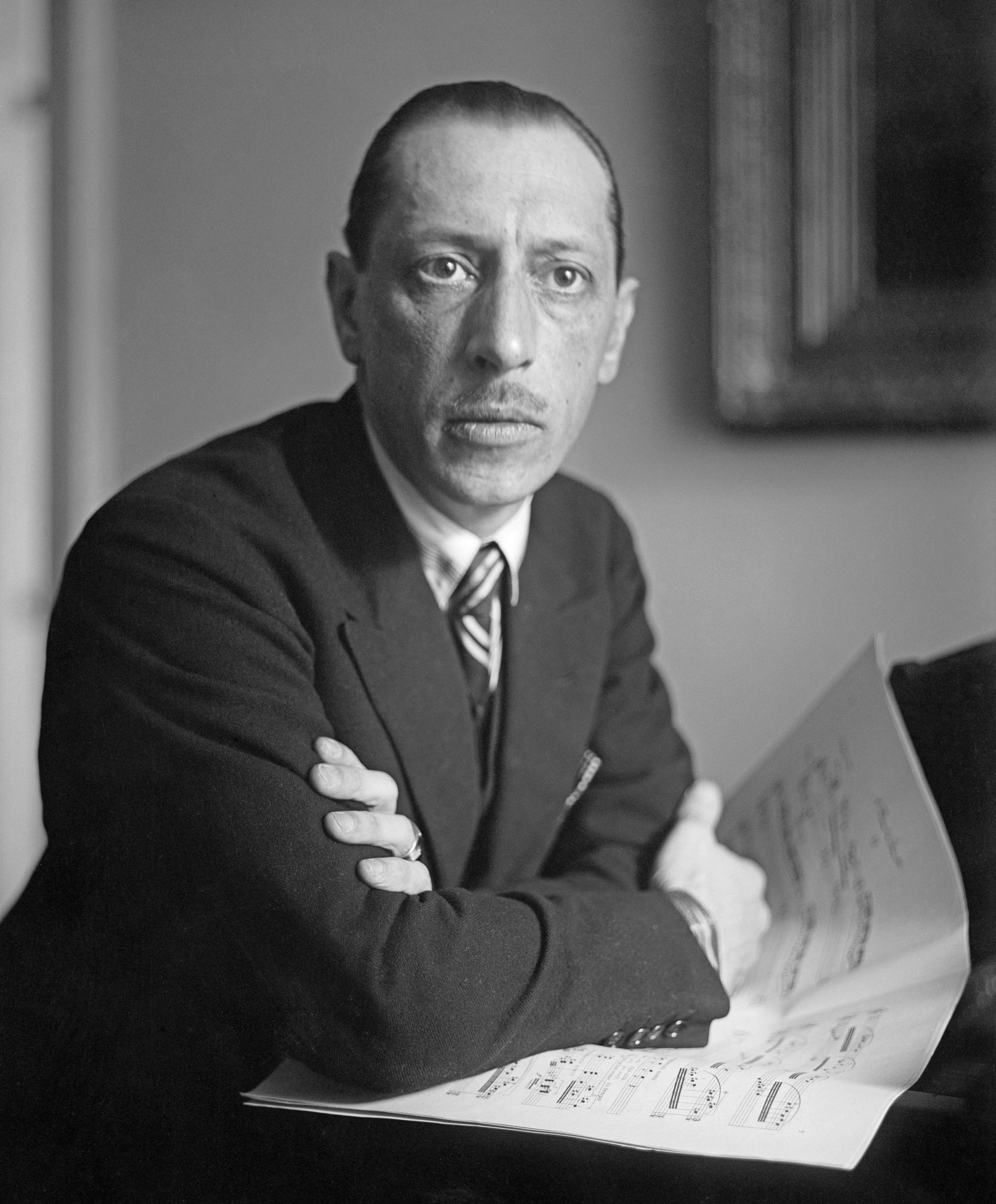
- Igor Stravinsky
- Composed: 1944
- Performed: 18 November 1945: Los Angeles
- Duration: 7 minutes
- Scoring: TTBB chorus and orchestra

Babel is a neoclassical religious cantata composed by Igor Stravinsky in 1944.

== Composition ==
Babel was written on commission from Nathaniel Shilkret, a conductor, composer and music director, who asked Stravinsky to contribute to a collaborative work titled Genesis Suite, based on the early chapters of the Book of Genesis. Although Shilkret's intention was to create a descriptive suite, using representational music on aesthetic as well as religious grounds, Stravinsky relied on abstract musical form to present the biblical text in a more objective manner, believing that he should not make any attempts at dramatically portraying the voice of God.

Arnold Schoenberg's Prelude was the first piece in the set, whereas Stravinsky's Babel was the last, on the subject of the building and destruction of the Tower of Babel. Stravinsky wrote his cantata on words taken from Genesis 11:1–9, in April 1944. Even though Béla Bartók, Paul Hindemith, and Sergei Prokofiev were also commissioned pieces for this suite, some of the pieces were never finished. Like most composite works, The full suite never had any independent life of its own after its completion in October 1945, but some of its parts have been performed, especially those by better-known composers.

Stravinsky's first piece written exclusively in English, Babel was premiered on 18 November 1945, at the Wilshire Ebel Theatre in Los Angeles, California, by the Werner Janssen Symphony Orchestra, with Werner Janssen himself as the conductor. Hugo Strelitz acted as the chorus master. The piece was subsequently published by Schott.

== Structure ==
The piece is in one movement and has a total duration of about seven minutes. The text used is taken from the Bible verbatim. It is scored for a two-part male chorus, three flutes, a piccolo, two oboes, two clarinets, a bass clarinet, two bassoons, a contrabassoon, four French horns, three trumpets, three trombones, a harp, a piano, and a string section. According to some scholars, the piece can be divided into four sections separated by tempo markings, though conductor Robert Craft often described the piece as "a passacaglia in which a fugue serves as one of the variations". Babel follows a neoclassical structure and form, and is a good example of Stravinsky's late neoclassical period.

Contrary to the publisher's wishes, who deemed it more appropriate to entrust God's words to the narrator and leave the story of the construction and destruction of the Tower of Babel for the choir, Stravinsky eventually decided to leave the narrated parts for the narrator and the voice of God for the men's choir, believing that the spoken human voice could not express well God's word. This was recurring for Stravinsky, as he made a clear distinction between the celestials and the terrestrials, intending that "the celestials should sing while the terrestrials should merely talk". He was, therefore, faced with this problem in Abraham and Isaac and The Flood.

== Reception ==
Stravinsky liked his own creation, as he claimed he preferred his own compositions performed untranslated, in the original language they were written. He stated: "musically speaking, Babel is a blessing".

== Recordings ==
Following is an incomplete list of some of the most notable recordings of this piece:

- Conductor Robert Craft and the Philharmonia Orchestra performed the piece with the Simon Joly Chorale and David Wilson-Johnson as the narrator. The recording took place at Abbey Road Studio No. 1, in London, on March 27, 2002. This recording was released by Naxos in 2006.
