= Ave Maria (Stravinsky) =

- by Igor Stravinsky
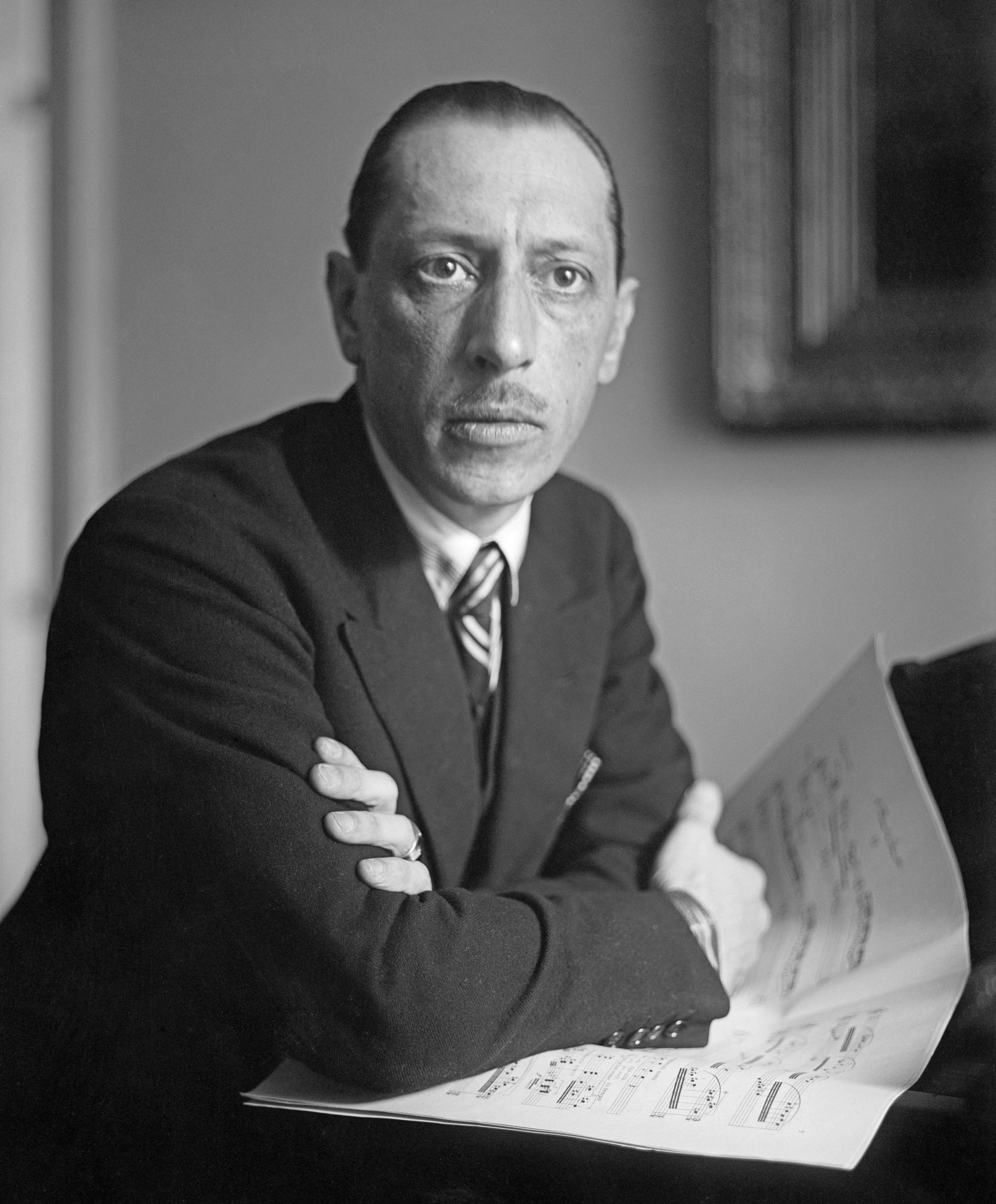
- Igor Stravinsky at the time of the composition
- Native name: Bogoroditse D'vo
- Composed: 18 May 1934: Paris
- Published: Boosey & Hawkes
- Duration: 1 minute
- Scoring: SATB chorus

Ave Maria (originally published using the Slavonic title Bogoroditse D'vo) is a short motet for SATB chorus by Russian composer Igor Stravinsky.

== Composition ==
Stravinsky, though in his later years came to be a practicing member of the Russian Orthodox Church, showed little interest in his own religious and spiritual research in his early adult years and only returned to the fold in 1926, after sixteen years outside the Communion, when he started attending religious services held by Russian emigrants living in Paris. It was at this time that Stravinsky started composing short pieces for unaccompanied chorus based on Orthodox texts. Ave Maria was the last of the three pieces to have survived during this period, the other two being Otche Nash (1926) and Credo (1932). The original manuscript by Stravinsky was then kept by fellow musician Nadia Boulanger, who later claimed Ave Maria was one of her favorite pieces to conduct, possibly because of its accessibility. She kept, at least, two versions: the actual, handwritten autograph, and two pages of a photostat of the autograph, paid for by Stravinsky himself. The latter is now kept in Lyon.

Ave Maria was finished in Paris, France, on 4 April 1934, and is known to have been played for the first time on 18 May 1934 at the Salle Gaveau, in Paris, as part of a memorial concert to American composer Blair Fairchild. It was originally written using texts in Slavic. In March 1949, however, since Stravinsky was struggling to earn money after moving into the United States, he decided to revise these three pieces and published them as a set, which later came to be known in recordings as Three Russian Sacred Choruses. As many other US compositions, it was published by Boosey & Hawkes. This time, he used Latin texts on all three pieces. These three pieces, together with his Mass, are the only liturgical pieces Stravinsky wrote.

== Structure ==
Ave Maria consists of a total of 36 bars and usually takes around a minute to perform. Given the fact that the church restricted all kinds of instruments in liturgical pieces, the piece is scored for a SATB chorus and is designed in a way that it doesn't require the choir to have reached high musical attainments. It is a homophonical piece and it is based on the Phrygian mode, with very little variations and almost no harmonic risks. The differences between the piece with Slavonic text and the one with Latin text are not many; however, the Latin version of the piece tends to be longer, since it was rearranged to adapt better to the natural cadence of the text in Latin. At the end of the piece, the choir also sings "Amen", which was not present in the Slavonic version.

== Recordings ==
Since this is one of the lesser known works written by Stravinsky, it is not performed very often. However, some notable vocal ensembles have recorded the piece, usually in compilations of works by Stravinsky. Some of the most notable recordings of this piece are included in the list below:

- The Gregg Smith Singers recorded the piece in 1992 at SUNY, Purchase, New York. This recording was released as part of a Robert Craft collection by Naxos Records in November 2006.
