= Étude pour pianola =

1917 composition by Igor Stravinsky

Igor Stravinsky as drawn by Pablo Picasso in 1920

The Étude pour Pianola is a 1917 composition for Pianola by Russian composer Igor Stravinsky. The Étude was first published on music roll in 1921 and the premiere was given by Reginald Reynolds at Aeolian Hall in London, on 13 October of that year.

== Composition ==
As Stravinsky was finishing Les Noces, he traveled to Madrid and became inspired by Spanish music for future compositions. This étude was commissioned by Aeolian Company, as a demonstration piece for their new sensible-to-dynamic-shadings player piano. Stravinsky finished it in 1917. However, it became much more popular later in 1928, when he orchestrated this piece together with the Three Pieces for String Quartet. The étude was retitled "Madrid", and the orchestration of all four pieces, titled Quatre études pour orchestre, was premiered in 1930.

== Analysis ==
This is one of the first compositions for pianola to include dynamic shadings. The original score consists of six staves, which means three pianists are required to perform the piece. However, Soulima Stravinsky later rearranged the orchestral score into a version for two pianos which included most of the original work's compositional density.
