= Pastorale (Stravinsky) =

1907 vocalise by Igor Stravinsky

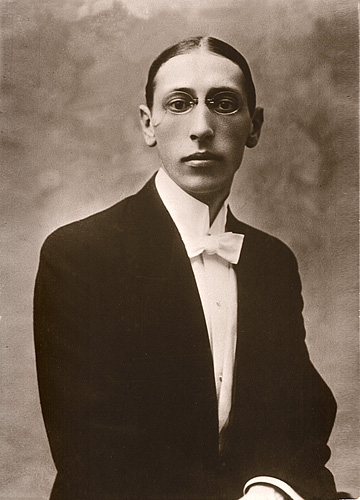
Igor Stravinsky c. 1905

Pastorale (Russian: Пастораль) is a vocalise written by Igor Stravinsky in 1907. Stravinsky composed it at his family's estate in Ustilug, Ukraine; under the supervision of Nikolai Rimsky-Korsakov, and dedicated it to his daughter Nadia.

The piece was originally scored for soprano and piano, but Stravinsky transcribed it several times over the years for various ensembles:

- soprano, oboe, English horn, clarinet, and bassoon (1923)
- violin and piano (1933)
- violin, oboe, English horn, clarinet, and bassoon (1933)

The two versions from 1933 are not strict transcriptions but lengthened versions lasting about two minutes longer than the original.

The 1933 version for violin and piano was written for violinist Samuel Dushkin, who had premiered Stravinsky's Violin Concerto two years earlier. Dushkin and Stravinsky premiered the new version in 1933. A version for viola and piano was transcribed by Vadim Borisovsky. Leopold Stokowski arranged the piece for five soloists (violin, oboe, English horn, clarinet and bassoon) and strings, conducting its first recording with the Philadelphia Orchestra in 1934.
