= The Owl and the Pussy Cat (Stravinsky) =

1966 song by Igor Stravinsky

- Song by Igor Stravinsky
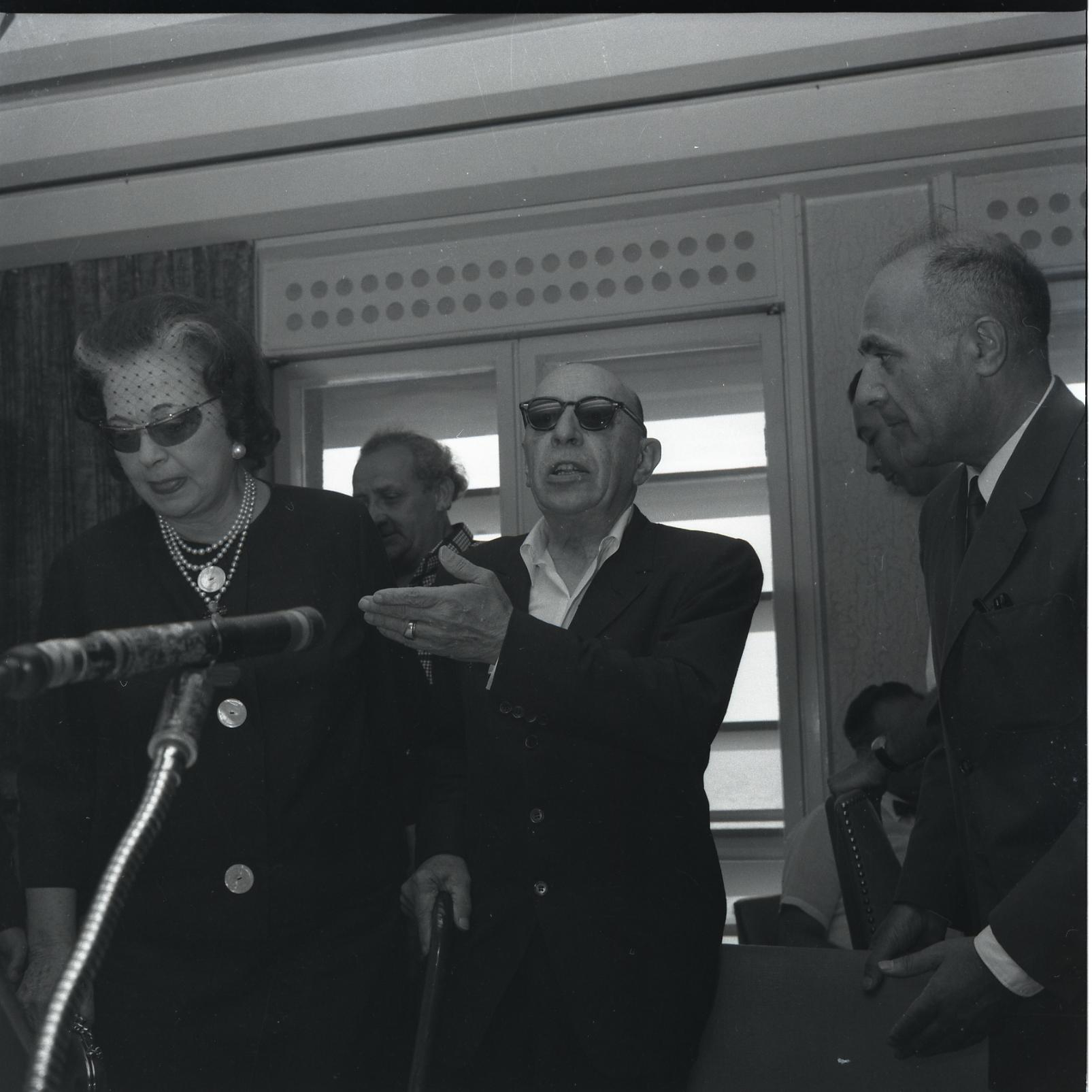
- Stravinsky with his wife Vera (left), 1962
- Text: Edward Lear
- Language: English
- Dedication: Vera Stravinsky
- Published: 1967
- Publisher: Boosey & Hawkes
- Duration: c. 3 minutes
- Scoring: Soprano; piano

Premiere
- Date: October 31, 1966
- Location: Monday Evening Concerts; Bing Theatre, Los Angeles County Museum of Art
- Performers: Peggy Bonini (soprano); Ingolf Dahl (piano)

"The Owl and the Pussy Cat" is a song for soprano and piano composed by Igor Stravinsky in 1966, based on the eponymous text by Edward Lear. It is Stravinsky's final completed original composition.

Stravinsky had known Lear's poem prior to setting it as it had been the first English language verses his wife Vera had memorized. He was reacquainted with it in July 1965 after she showed him a French translation by Frances Steegmuller and composed his setting of the original text in October 1966. The song was dedicated to his wife.

It was premiered by soprano Peggy Bonini and pianist Ingolf Dahl at Monday Evening Concerts on October 31, 1966. Robert Craft ranked the song among Stravinsky's greatest.

== Background ==
Stravinsky had been familiar with Edward Lear's poem "The Owl and the Pussy-Cat" before he set it to music. It had been the first English poem his wife Vera memorized. In 1961, she learned that a French translation by Frances Steegmuller had been published by the New Yorker. She was not able to acquire it until July 1965, when Lillian Libman, Stravinsky's representative, brought her a copy. Vera presented it to Stravinsky, who then read it.

Stravinsky did not begin work on the song until after completing the Requiem Canticles in 1966, though the Los Angeles Times' Walter Arlen wrote that Stravinsky withheld work on the song to ensure "the mass for the dead would not be his final work". Robert Craft said that Stravinsky did not inform Vera of the song's existence until it was complete; he may have had her voice in mind while composing it:

The elegant fowl kept the composition a secret, in any case, until he had sung and played it for his feline love, not in a pea-green boat, of course, but in his sound-proof roost.

Stravinsky dedicated the song to Vera. On the score's title page he drew his own rendering of Lear's illustration of the poem, to which he added waves in order to convey that his "music [was] probably rocking the boat". He gave the manuscript and sketches for the song to Craft on March 31, 1968, in commemoration of the 20th anniversary of their friendship.

== Music and text ==
"The Owl and the Pussy Cat" is scored for soprano and piano. It unfolds in the form of an invention, with both the vocal and piano lines marked by a lightly undulating rhythm. Stravinsky, who called the song a "sigh of release", said to Craft:

[Its] origins were in the trimeter rhythms of the title ... The rhythmic cell suggested a group of pitches, which I expanded into a twelve-note series in correspondence to the stanzaic shape of the poem. The piano octaves formed a syncopated canonic voice as well as a double mirror, the vocal movement being reflected between both the upper and lower voices.

He explained to George Balanchine that the song "should be impersonated: a little hooted, a little meowed, a little grunted for the pig". A typical performance lasts approximately 2 minutes and 40 seconds to 3 minutes. It is Stravinsky's last completed original composition.

== Premiere ==
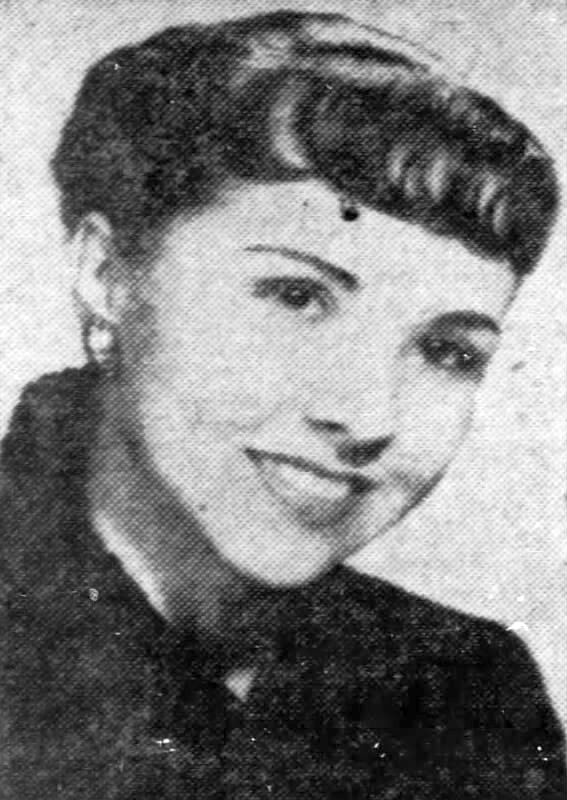
Soprano Peggy Bonini in 1955

The world premiere performance of "The Owl and the Pussy Cat" took place at the Los Angeles County Museum of Art's Bing Theatre on October 31, 1966, as part of the Monday Evening Concerts. Lawrence Morton, director of the series, kept the song's inclusion on the program a secret and only announced it to the audience moments before the performance. It was Monday Evening Concerts' 12th premiere of a work by Stravinsky, who listened to the performance from the wings rather than among the audience.

Ingolf Dahl, a friend of Stravinsky, played the piano part. Soprano Gloria Grace Prosper, who had been scheduled to sing Ernst Krenek's Quintina on that program, was chosen by Stravinsky to sing the world premiere of "The Owl and the Pussy Cat". Two days before the performance, illness forced her to withdraw from the concert. Peggy Bonini was recruited as a replacement, but had trouble learning the song, which provoked the irritation of the composer, who was present at the rehearsals.

Soprano Adrienne Albert was accompanied by Craft on the song's premiere recording, which was issued by Columbia Records in 1968. It was Craft's first recording as a pianist.

== Reception ==
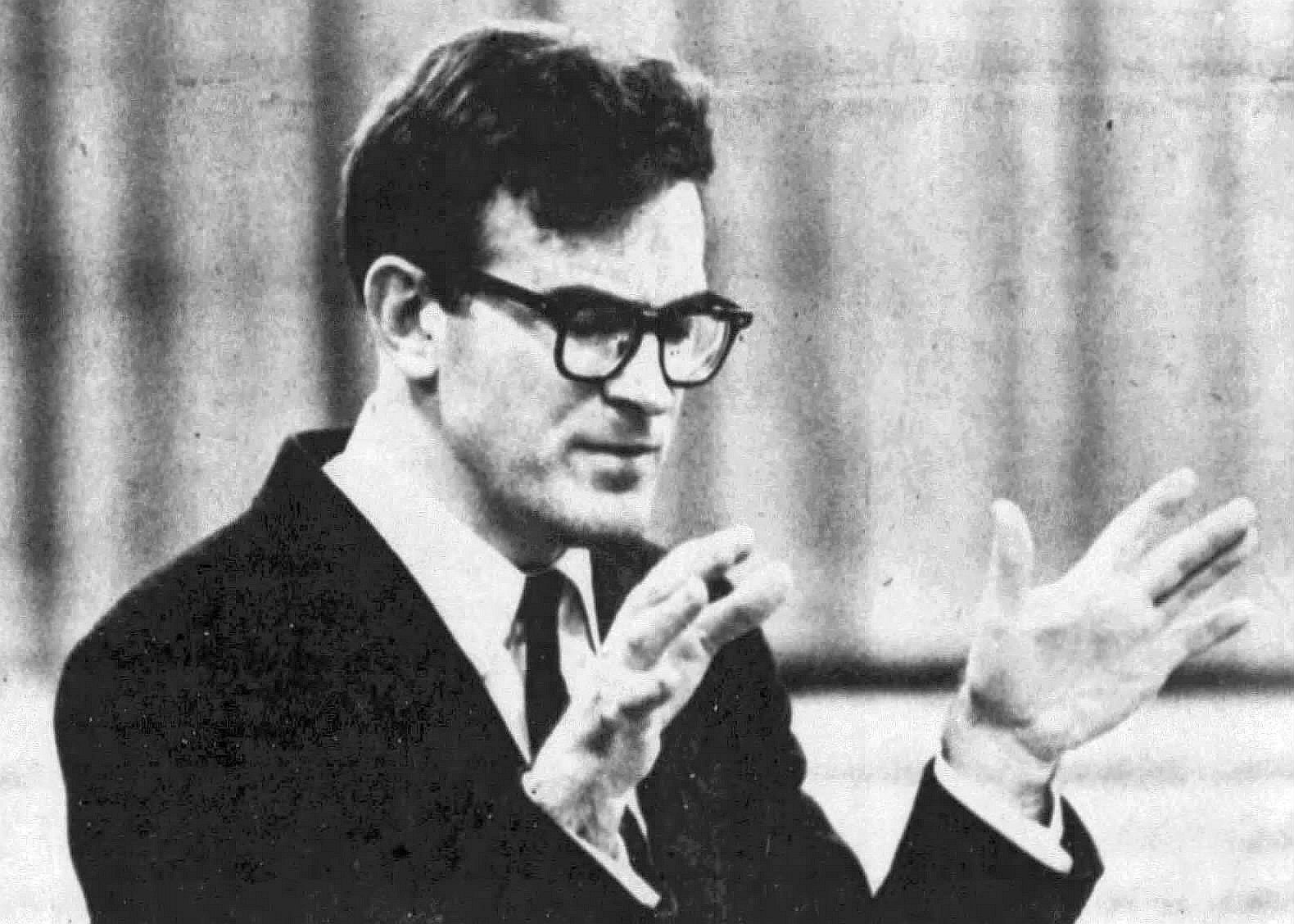
Robert Craft (pictured circa 1967) regarded "The Owl and the Pussy Cat" as one of Stravinsky's best songs

Arlen in his review for the Los Angeles Times praised "The Owl and the Pussy Cat" as "eminently singable" and compared it favorably to Stravinsky's Pribaoutki:

Naturally, the new work is based on a tone row, but reveals definite implications of tonality, retains a simple aura, has great clarity, and radiated positive charm.

Musicologist Roman Vlad also held "The Owl and the Pussy Cat" in similar regard, noting that a "lay listener" encountering the song for the first time might get the impression that Stravinsky returned to the style of the Scherzo fantastique and Petrushka:

"The Owl and the Pussy Cat" actually does reflect something of the music of that period (especially the works with a child-like flavor in which he set to music those delightful Russian nonsense rhymes) viewed through the prism of Stravinsky's contemporary serial writing ... Stravinsky's sensibility is once again seen to be one of the essential factors working from within to ensure the unity of his seemingly protean creativeness.

Luciano Berio described "The Owl and the Pussy Cat" as a "musical charm" in his program notes for its European premiere at the 1967 ISCM Festival in Venice. Craft ranked it, along with Stravinsky's other English language songs, among the composer's greatest.
