= Les cinq doigts =

1921 piano composition by Igor Stravinsky

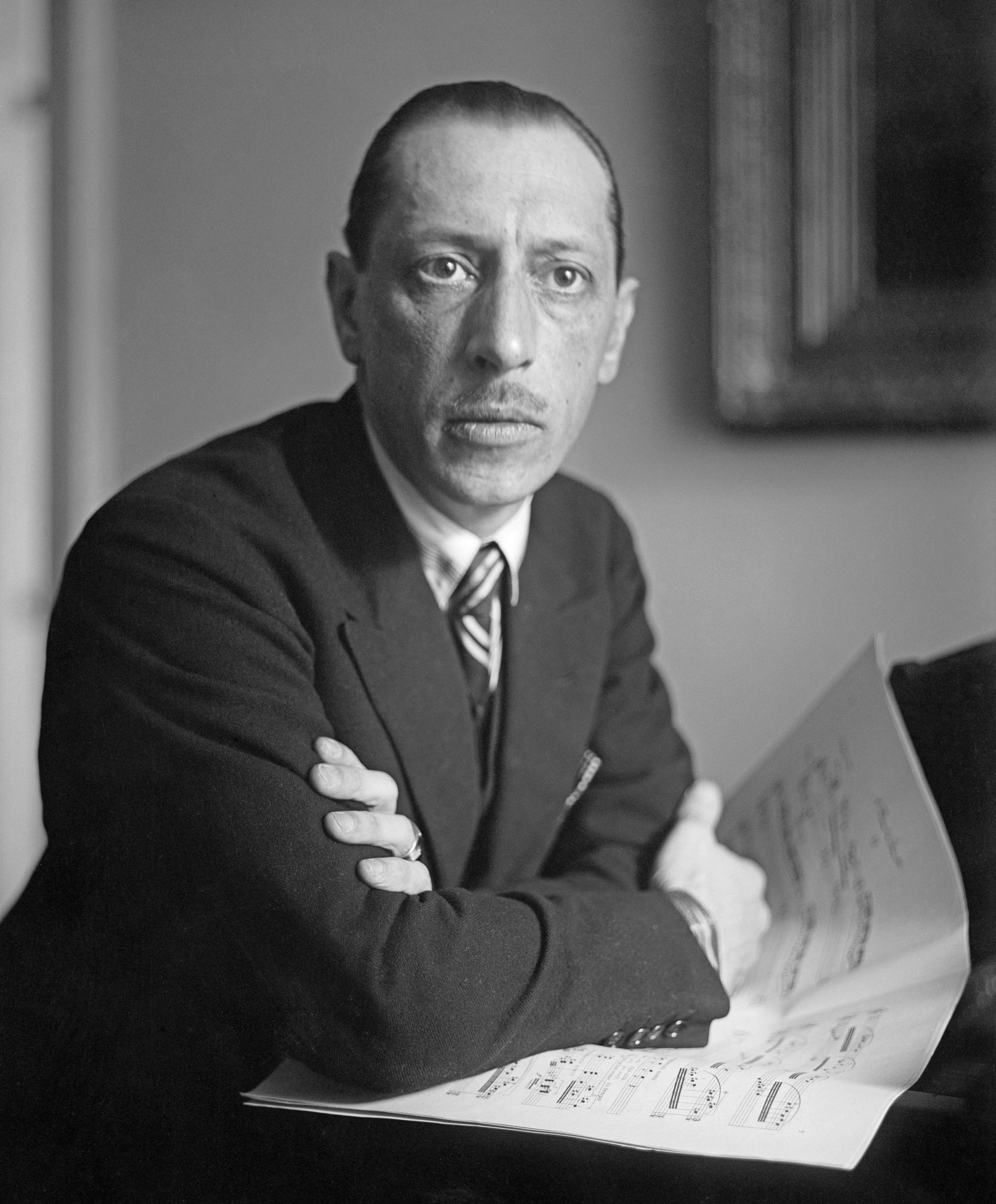
Igor Stravinsky in the 1920s

Les cinq doigts is a 1921 piano composition by Igor Stravinsky. Subtitled 8 mélodies très faciles sur 5 notes (8 very easy melodies on 5 notes), the work comprises eight short pieces in which the right hand generally plays only five notes, remaining in essentially the same position at the keyboard throughout the work. The movements of the work have these tempo markings:

1. Andantino
2. Allegro
3. Allegretto
4. Larghetto
5. Moderato
6. Lento
7. Vivo
8. Pesante

Richard Taruskin has noted that the third section, the "Allegretto", is an arrangement of the Russian folk melody "Kamarinskaya".

Stravinsky made a recording of Les cinq doigts for Brunswick Records as part of his first recording contract, signed in 1925.

In 1962, the composer orchestrated the pieces, adding a few counter-melodies and imitations, yielding the chamber work, Eight Miniatures for Fifteen Players.

The Moderato movement is featured in the movie Coco Chanel and Igor Stravinsky.
