= Ode (Stravinsky) =

1943 orchestral work by Igor Stravinsky

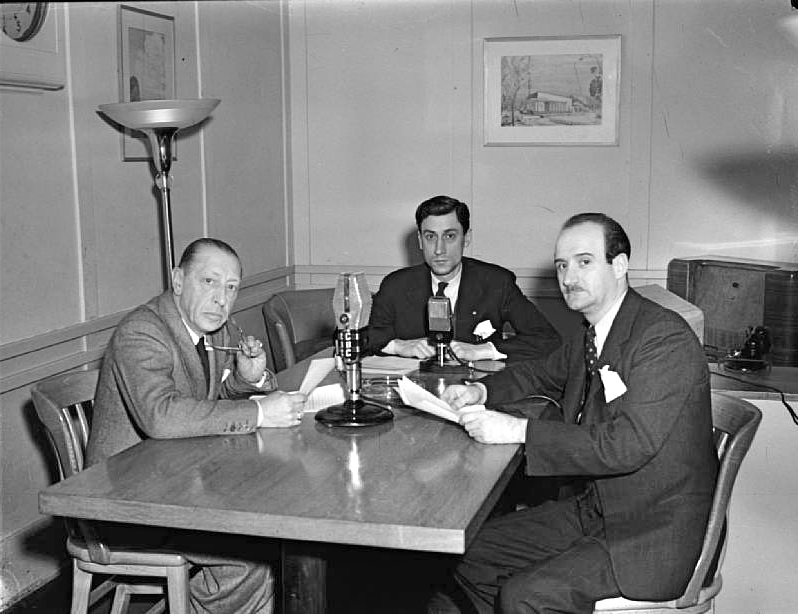
Igor Stravinsky (left) in 1945

Ode: Elegiacal Chant in Three Parts (in memory of Natalie Koussevitzky) is an orchestral work from 1943 composed by Igor Stravinsky. Prior to its completion, the score's working title had been Triads.

== History ==
In February 1943, upon the personal urging of Orson Welles, Stravinsky began work on a short-lived project composing music for 20th Century Fox's Jane Eyre. He copied a number of melodies he had selected from an early 19th century American collection of British folk songs, and began to make notes on the film's scenario. Emerging from this was background music for a hunting scene in the film, which incorporated a sketch the composer had labeled "Song for Bessie." After Bernard Herrmann replaced him in Jane Eyre, Stravinsky recycled this music into what eventually became the "Eclogue" to the Ode. While visiting New York City in April of that year, Serge Koussevitzky presented the composer with a commission for a new orchestral work in memory of his wife, Natalia. Stravinsky's fee would be paid by the conductor's newly established Koussevitzky Foundation. The score was completed in July 1943.

Stravinsky sent the finished Ode to Koussevitzky on July 9. He described the music's first part as "a praise to the departed," and its central section as a "concert champêtre, t[hat] i[s], music at the heart of nature, the principle which [your wife] defended with such passion and which you realized so brilliantly in Tanglewood." Of the closing "Epitaph" the composer said that it was a "headstone inscription ... which will conclude my song in memory of the departed." Koussevitzky replied on July 21 that he was "deeply touched and grateful" for the music.

Two weeks before the score's debut, Stravinsky assured Koussevitzky that the score and parts he had sent for the Ode were "carefully corrected" by him. Nevertheless, a number of errors committed by the music copyists and the composer himself had escaped his notice. The resulting "mild cacophony" heard in the closing moments of its world premiere on October 8, his wife Vera noted, left Stravinsky feeling "sad because [it] was badly played". Although he apologized profusely to Koussevitzky in private for his "ridiculous inattentiveness" in proofreading the Ode, Stravinsky never publicly acknowledged any culpability in the botched premiere.

== Ballet ==
Ode was choreographed as a ballet by Lorca Massine (son of Léonide). The premiere took place on June 23, 1972, as part of New York City Ballet's Stravinsky Festival at the New York State Theater, Lincoln Center.
