= Zvezdoliki =

1912 cantata by Igor Stravinsky

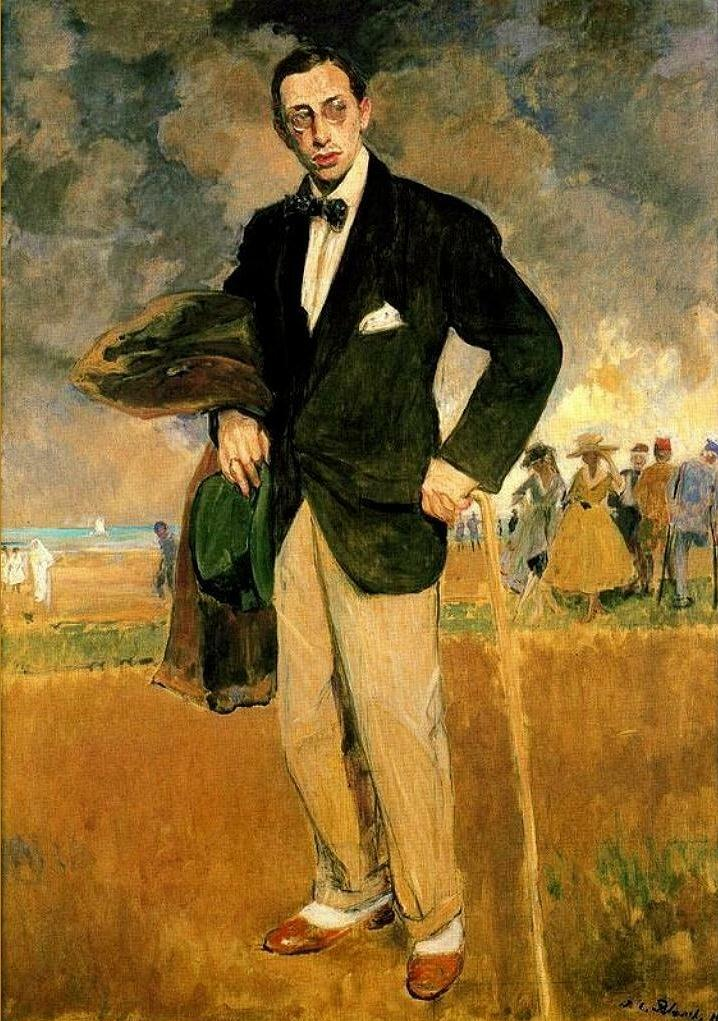
Portrait of Igor Stravinsky by Jacques-Émile Blanche (1915)

Le roi des étoiles (The King of the Stars; Russian: Звездоликий, romanized: Zvezdolikiy) is a cantata by Igor Stravinsky, composed in 1911–12. It is set to a text by the Russian poet Konstantin Balmont and published in 1913 by P. Jurgenson. The original Russian title literally means "Star-face" or "The Star-Faced One". The work is more commonly known by the French title as translated by Michel-Dimitri Calvocoressi.

The work is very rarely performed, primarily because it is written for an unusually large orchestra — quadruple woodwind, eight horns, three trumpets, three trombones, tuba, timpani, bass drum, tam-tam (the entire percussion section only plays in one measure), two harps, celesta, and heavily divided strings—plus six-part men's chorus — and because it lasts barely five minutes and encompasses just 54 measures.

Claude Debussy, to whom the work is dedicated, praised the work in a 1913 letter to the composer; though describing it as "extraordinary", he doubted that it would soon find an audience, given its complexities and its short duration. Le roi des étoiles was not performed in public until 1939. On 19 April of that year, in Brussels, Belgium, the conductor Franz André led the Orchestra of Radio Brussels.

The published score does not address a significant question: whether or not the chorus is to sing the chords that set the four syllables of the Russian title and that appear separately at the top of the first page. The recordings conducted by Michael Tilson Thomas on Deutsche Grammophon (Boston Symphony Orchestra and the Men's Chorus of the New England Conservatory Choir, 1972, SACD 2015), Riccardo Chailly on Decca/London (Berlin Radio Symphony Orchestra and Chorus, 1984), Robert Craft on Music Masters Classics (Orchestra of St. Luke's and the Gregg Smith Singers, 1995), Pierre Boulez on Deutsche Grammophon (Cleveland Orchestra and Chorus, 1996), and Michael Gielen on SWR Music (SWR Symphonieorchester and SWR Vokalensemble, 2017) all include them.
