= Two Sketches for a Sonata =

1968 piano sketch by Igor Stravinsky

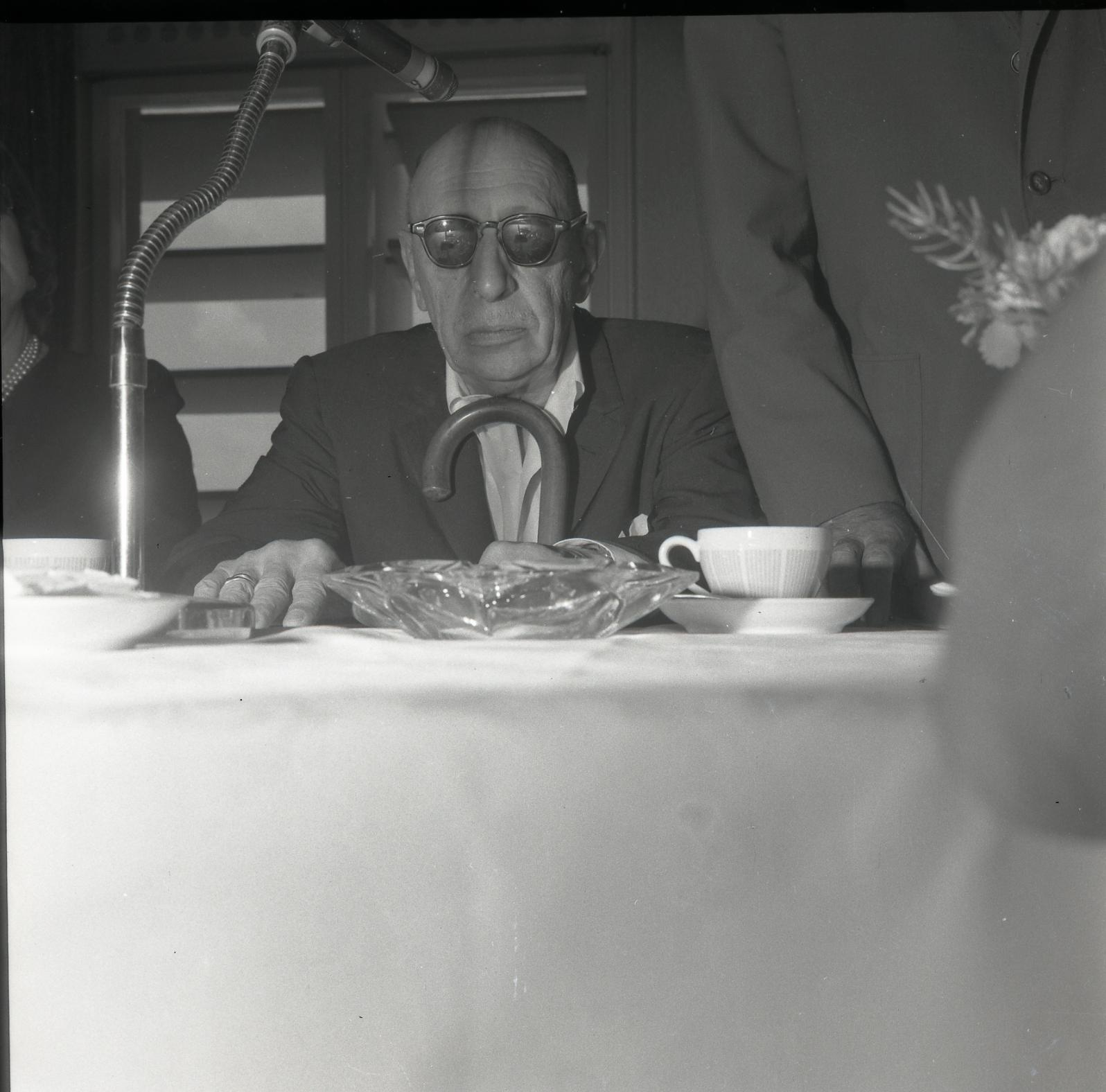
Stravinsky in 1962

The "Two Sketches for a Sonata" (also known as the "Two Études for a Piano Sonata") are parts of an unfinished piano work by Igor Stravinsky. He dated the manuscript 1966 and it is composed in his late twelve-tone style. It is his last attempt at original composition.

== Background ==
According to Robert Craft, Stravinsky worked on the sketches until January 25, 1968, at which point he put them aside because he had ambitions to compose a larger work wherein he could better realize some of the ideas in the "Two Sketches for a Sonata":

I had no sooner forbidden myself to use octaves in one piece than I saw what richness I could extract from them, and I used them in the next piece all the time.

Stravinsky's librarian reported that the work was projected to be for piano and instruments "with a solo section". Pierre Souvtchinsky, who visited Stravinsky in October 1967, saw the sketches. He described them to Mariya Yudina as an "invention, sonata, and variations", but was skeptical about their prospects for being completed.

Musicologist Jonathan Cross wrote in his preface to the score for the "Two Sketches for a Sonata" that the music resembled the "sparse, concentrated style" of the Requiem Canticles and possess Stravinsky's characteristic "rhythmic vitality". How he intended to develop the sketches is unclear:

He simply copied them out neatly and left them as a tantalizing glimpse of what might have been. Or perhaps, despite their title, he felt that they were complete in themselves, perfectly formed miniatures that required nothing more. We shall never know.

Craft said that their brevity and incompleteness notwithstanding, the "Two Sketches for a Sonata" are a "perfectly formed composition" deserving of inclusion in Stravinsky's canon. Cross said they "have their own understated beauty, a poignant summing-up of a life’s work."

In March 2021, the "Two Sketches for a Sonata" were published for the first time in commemoration of the 50th anniversary of Stravinsky's death. The manuscript is held in the archives of the Paul Sacher Foundation.
