= Five Easy Pieces (Stravinsky) =

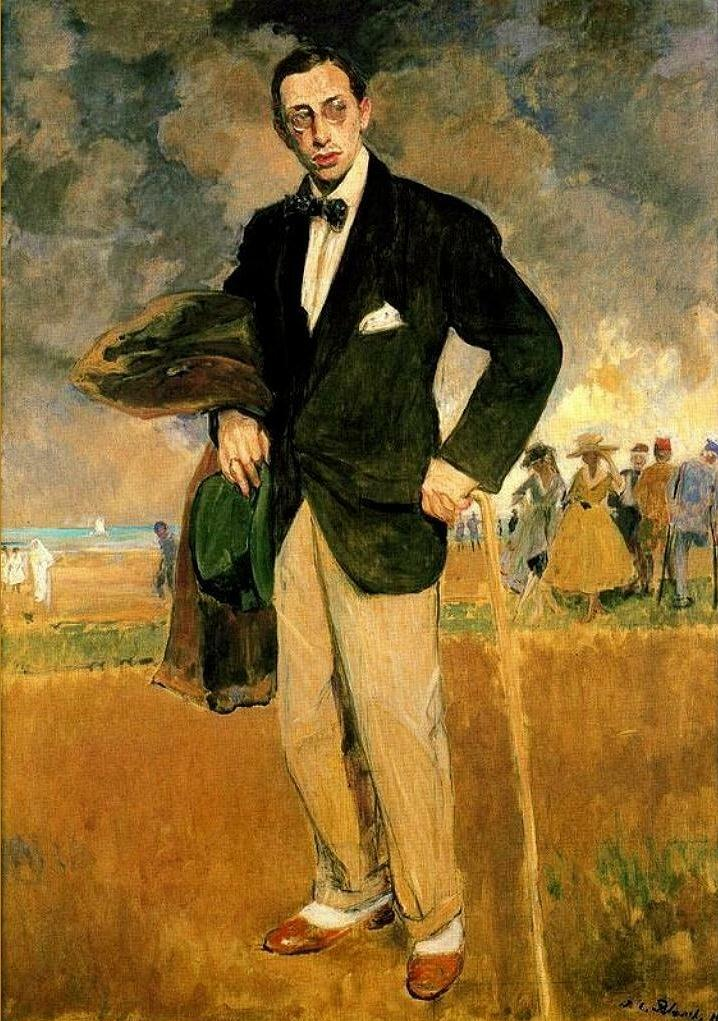
Portrait of Igor Stravinsky by Jacques-Émile Blanche (1915)

Five Easy Pieces, also referred to by its original French title Cinq pièces faciles, is a collection of pieces for four hands by Russian composer Igor Stravinsky. It was finished in 1917 and was published as a set in the winter of 1917/18.

== Composition ==
The Five Easy Pieces were commissioned by French patroness Eugène Murat in November 1916. The original offer was to publish Stravinsky's Three Pieces for String Quartet, which he refused to do. However, he agreed to publish several short pieces, among them Renard, Berceuses du chat and the soon to be composed Five Easy Pieces under the Geneva-based company run by Adolphe Henn. Stravinsky composed each of the movements of the collection in only one day in his house in Morges.

The first movement, Andante was composed on January 4, 1917; the third movement, Balalaika, which was also Stravinsky's favorite piece in the set, was composed on February 6, 1917; the fourth one, Napolitana, was composed on February 21, 1917; the fifth one, Galop, was composed on February 28, 1917. After this, he took a break which took him more than expected, and finished the second piece, Española, on April 3, 1917, just one day before shipping all the compositions for publication. All the compositions were published later that same year, and this set was premiered in Paris on February 9, 1918.

== Analysis ==
A typical performance of the compositions lasts approximately five to six minutes. The movement list is as follows:

1. Andante
2. Española
3. Balalaika
4. Napolitana
5. Galop

As with his other twin set, Three Easy Pieces, these five pieces have been acknowledged by scholars and fellow musicians as Gebrauchsmusik, that is, music that was not initially thought to be performed, but which serves a specific purpose. In this case, both compositions were meant to be used as educational tools for Stravinsky's children. Here, the primo voice is much easier than the secondo, contrary to Three Easy Pieces, in which the secondo was the easy part.

For this composition, Stravinsky was inspired by the styles of different regions, cultures, and cultural movements. The first movement, Andante, is a homage to Erik Satie, and accordingly, uses a similar style. The second movement, Española, was inspired by Stravinsky's recollections of his visit to Spain on the previous summer. The third movement, Balalaika, presents a strong reminiscence to Stravinsky's Russian roots. The fourth movement, Napolitana, was inspired in his first visit to Italy and tries to imitate the Napolitan style. Some musicians, as fellow pianist Paul Jacobs, have acknowledged an indirect reference (or "misquotation", as Jacobs said) to the popular song "Funiculì, Funiculà". Finally, the fifth movement, Galop, tries to resemble a French Can-can and is based on sketches that were first conceived when composing the Three Easy Pieces.

== Arrangements ==
The first four movements were reworked, arranged for small orchestra, and published as Suite No. 1. However, he decided to leave Galop out and arranged it for small orchestra for Suite No. 2, possibly taking into account when it was first conceived. Suite No. 1 was published in 1921, but was first performed in 1926, whereas Suite No. 2 was published in 1925.
