= Elegy for J.F.K. =

1964 composition by Igor Stravinsky

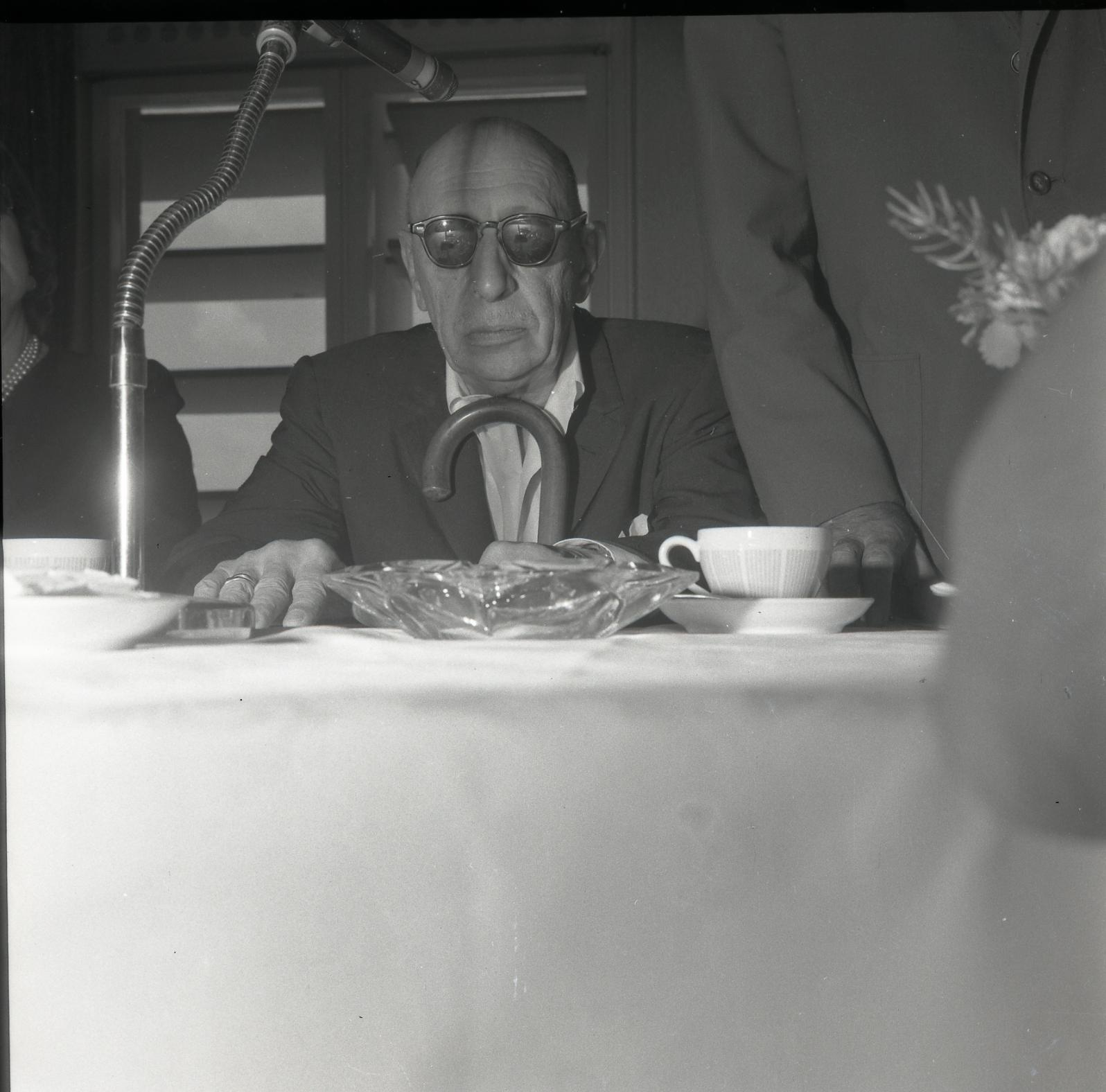
Igor Stravinsky in 1962

Elegy for J.F.K. is a piece of vocal music composed by the Russian-born composer Igor Stravinsky in 1964, commemorating the assassination of U.S. President John F. Kennedy.

== Composition background ==
After the outbreak of World War II and his emigration to Los Angeles, California, in 1939, Stravinsky continued to work within the neo-classical framework he had adopted since about 1920 (following his Russian period of 1907–1919), but beginning in the early 1950s turned to various serial techniques, which he used until his death in 1971.

== Music overview and analysis ==
Elegy for J. F. K. is scored for baritone or mezzo-soprano accompanied by three clarinets (two B♭ clarinets and an alto clarinet in E♭), and is a twelve-tone serial composition. The text, in four haiku stanzas each of 17 syllables, was written at Stravinsky's request by W. H. Auden in memory of assassinated President John F. Kennedy, and Stravinsky chose to repeat the opening stanza at the end. Elegy makes use of various textural changes to accommodate the changes in vocal register. The piece is in ternary form, just like the poem, meaning that material is repeated in the first and last nine measures. Various compositional elements suggest the severity of the topic such as the frequent use of da capo, the perfect fifth D♯–A♯ in the clarinets from mm. 7–8, and the repeated tritone G♯–D throughout.

Stravinsky composed the vocal line first, only adding the accompaniment afterward—a working method he likened to Schoenberg's in the Phantasie for violin and piano. The row Stravinsky uses for the Elegy,

G♯, D, C, A♯, E, F, B, A, G, F♯, D♯, and C♯

is remarkable for the three tritones that occur in the first half. This row is related to the two rows Stravinsky previously used in the Bransles movement of Agon and at the words "Te Deum" in The Flood, by reordering the six pitch-class dyads in each row.

A twelve-tone analysis of this piece shows some patterns of the style. As in all twelve-tone music, there is a mathematical relationship between the prime, inverted, and retrograde series. For example, the melody pitches in mm. 1–8 are P_{0}, and the harmonic pitches that the clarinets play are RI_{0} (D♯, C♯, A♯, A, G, F, B, C, F♯, E, D, and G♯), with some repeated pitches and the perfect fifth of D♯ and A♯ played in mm. 7 and 8. Stravinsky uses the P_{0} form in all of the measure rows except mm. 9–13 which uses RI_{0}. The words for these measures have the lyrics "Why then? Why there? / Why thus, we cry, did he die?"

== See also ==
- Cultural depictions of John F. Kennedy
