= Piano-Rag-Music =

Stravinsky as drawn by Pablo Picasso in 1920

Piano-Rag-Music is a composition for piano solo by Igor Stravinsky, written in 1919.

Stravinsky, who had, by that time, emigrated to France after his studies with Nikolai Rimsky-Korsakov in Russia, was confronted with American jazz combos actively influential in Europe. Stravinsky's knowledge of stylistic jazz properties was at first limited to scores brought to him from the United States by his colleague Ernest Ansermet. However, he had managed to hear live jazz bands by the time he finished Piano-Rag Music.

Compositionally, Stravinsky interprets the ragtime in a rather cubist way, instead of directly imitating the style. Stravinsky incorporates elements from his Russian period (ostinati, shifting accents, bitonality) with rhythmic and harmonic fragments from ragtime. The irregular meters give the piece an improvisatory character.

Stravinsky wrote the piece for Arthur Rubinstein, but it was instead premiered by José Iturbi, on November 8, 1919 in Lausanne.
