= Septet (Stravinsky) =

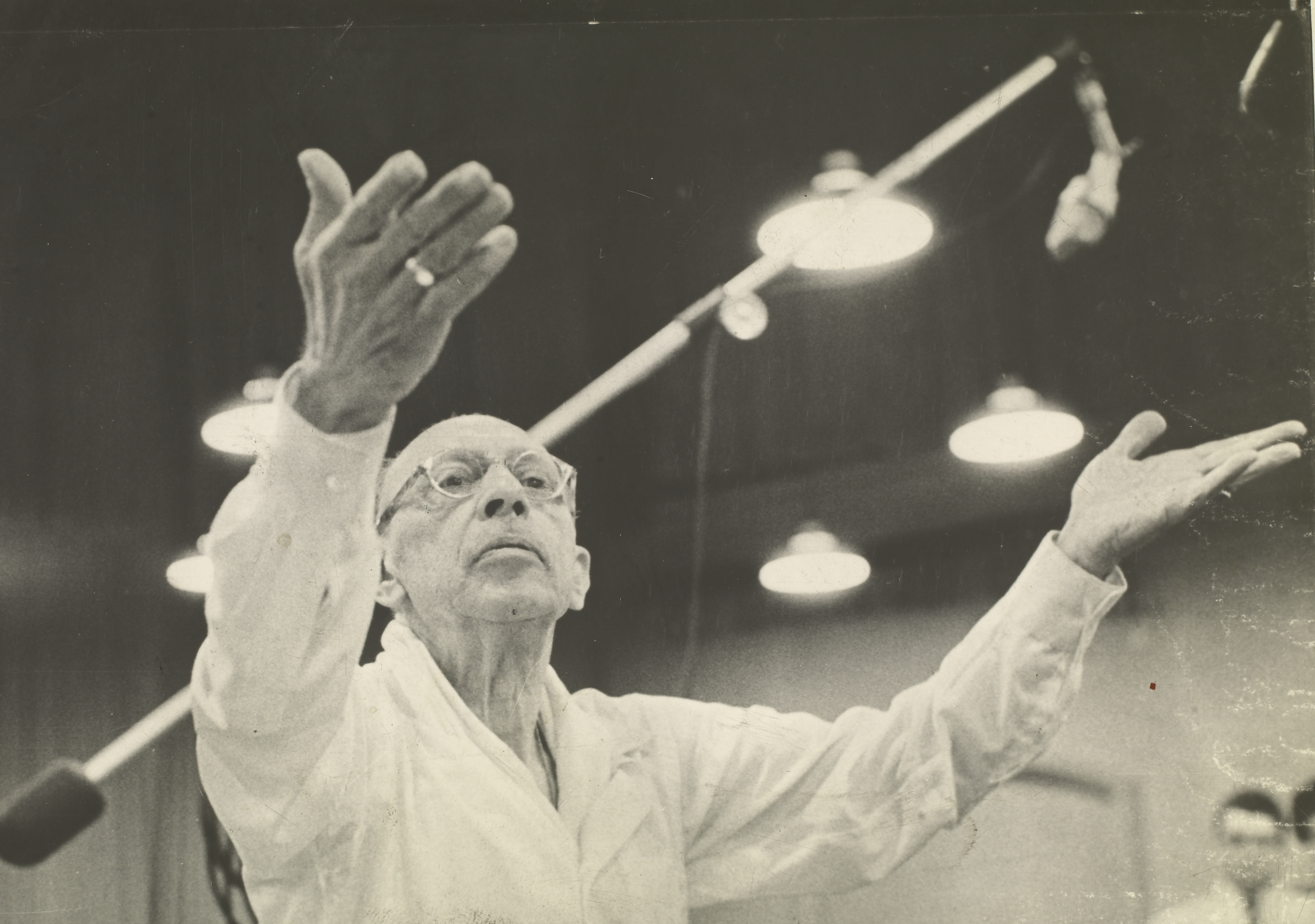
Igor Stravinsky in 1962

The Septet for clarinet, bassoon, horn, piano, violin, viola and cello is a chamber music composition by Igor Stravinsky. The septet was composed between July 1952 and February 1953, and the first performance took place at Dumbarton Oaks in Washington, D.C., on 23 January 1954. The score is dedicated to the Dumbarton Oaks Research Library and Collection.

It consists of three movements, the first lacking a title, and the last lacking a number in the score.

1. Quarter note [sic] = 88 or = 88
2. Passacaglia, circa = 60
3. [number lacking in the score] Gigue, . = 112–116

The work is influenced by twelve-tone technique, especially by the Wind Quintet, Op. 26, and the Suite for septet, Op. 29, composed by Arnold Schoenberg.

== Analysis ==
The Septet stands at a stylistic turning point in Stravinsky's œuvre, between the neoclassical period ending with his opera, The Rake's Progress, and the final, serial phase. All of the Septet is characterized by highly contrapuntal textures, but the first movement remains close to Stravinsky's earlier manner, whereas the remaining two exhibit his emerging new style. Stravinsky's adoption of serial techniques, here and in the Ricercar II of the Cantata (1952), caught nearly everyone by surprise at that time.

The first movement is in sonata-allegro form, with a first theme group in the winds in the key of A, characteristically hesitating between major and minor and strongly recalling the opening of Stravinsky's "Dumbarton Oaks" Concerto (1938). The second theme is in the piano, with a series of syncopated E-minor chords, and is followed by a developmental fugue for the winds and strings. The recapitulation has the first theme in its original key but the second now in D minor, and the movement closes with a short coda. The main theme of this movement anticipates the pitch material of the second and third movements, as its recurring thematic motto is the same as the first five notes of the tone-row used in the Passacaglia and Gigue.

The second movement, according to Robert Craft, "is everything, ... the Passacaglia, that's where the big change occurs". The second movement is actually a repetition of the note-pattern of the Passacaglia, a set of nine variations over a bass theme consisting of a series of sixteen notes. The movement ends with a coda, or tenth variation, but the ninth variation is the climax, "an utter marvel", according to Craft, "because all seven instruments are playing the same pianissimo and you must hear every note and you do hear every note". Stravinsky uses the bass theme similarly to Schoenberg's twelve-note series. The upper parts consist of various sorts of canons using the same sequence sixteen notes, with imitation at various intervals, by inversion, retrograde, and inversion of the retrograde.

The third movement consists of a succession of four fugues, all based on the same sixteen-tone series used in the Passacaglia. The first is a three-voice fugue for strings. This is then repeated in the piano, with another fugue for wind trio superimposed on it, thereby forming a double fugue. The subject of the new wind fugue uses the same notes, but with different rhythms. The third and fourth fugues are disposed similarly to the first pair: a three-part fugue for the strings, followed by a double fugue for the piano and the winds, now with the note rows of the subjects inverted. The entries in all four fugues present a double tonal center on A and E.

== Published editions ==
- Stravinsky, Igor: Septet for clarinet, horn, bassoon, piano, violin, viola, and violoncello. London: Boosey & Hawkes, 1953 (BH 6400701 – parts, BH 6500518 – study score)
- Stravinsky, Igor: Septet 1953 for clarinet, horn, bassoon, piano, violin, viola, and violoncello. New York: Boosey & Hawkes, 1953 (B&H 17447 – Hawkes Pocket Scores No. 682).
