= Piano Sonata (Stravinsky) =

1924 composition by Igor Stravinsky

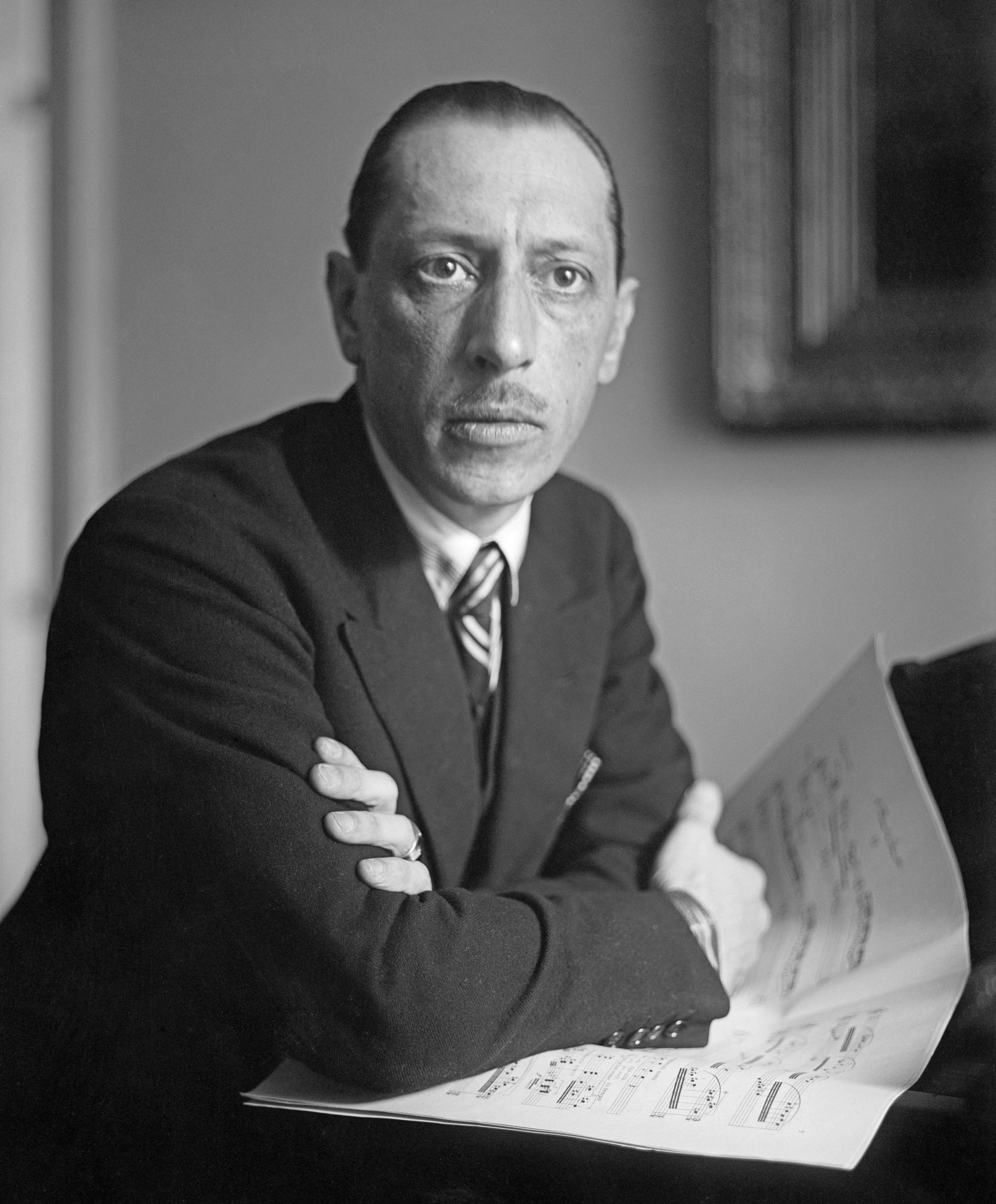
Igor Stravinsky in the early 1920s

The Piano Sonata, or Sonata for Piano, or in its original French form, Sonate pour piano, is a 1924 piano sonata by Russian expatriate composer Igor Stravinsky.

== Composition ==
Stravinsky composed this sonata when he was in Biarritz and Nice in the summer of 1924. He finished it on 21 October that year. According to Robert Cummings at AllMusic, it was first performed by the composer at the Donaueschingen Festival on 26 July 1925. According to musicologist Matthew Werley, it was premiered by Felix Petyrek. It was eventually edited by Albert Spalding and published by Boosey & Hawkes in 1925. It is dedicated to the Princess Edmond de Polignac, Winnaretta Singer.

== Structure ==
The sonata is in three movements and takes between 9 and 11 minutes to perform. The movements are:

1. ♩ = 112
2. Adagietto
3. ♩ = 112

In some recordings, the first movement is titled Moderato and the third Allegro moderato; however, such titles or tempo markings are not present in the original score.

== Analysis ==
The first and the third movement are related to each other: both share the same tempo and both are in sonata form, each with its own recapitulation; furthermore, as for the thematic material, the first theme played on two hands simultaneously at the beginning is played again at the coda in the last movement. The first movement counters triplets with eighth notes, whereas the invention-like third movement consists of sixteenth notes that makes it more lively, closer to Baroque styles. The second movement is closer to the Romantic style of Beethoven, who, in Stravinsky's estimation, was one of the "greatest musical geniuses"; therefore, the ornamentation of the melody is more dense, which is unlike Stravinsky's simple and direct compositional style employed in the prior movement.
