= Fanfare for a New Theatre =

Composition by Igor Stravinsky

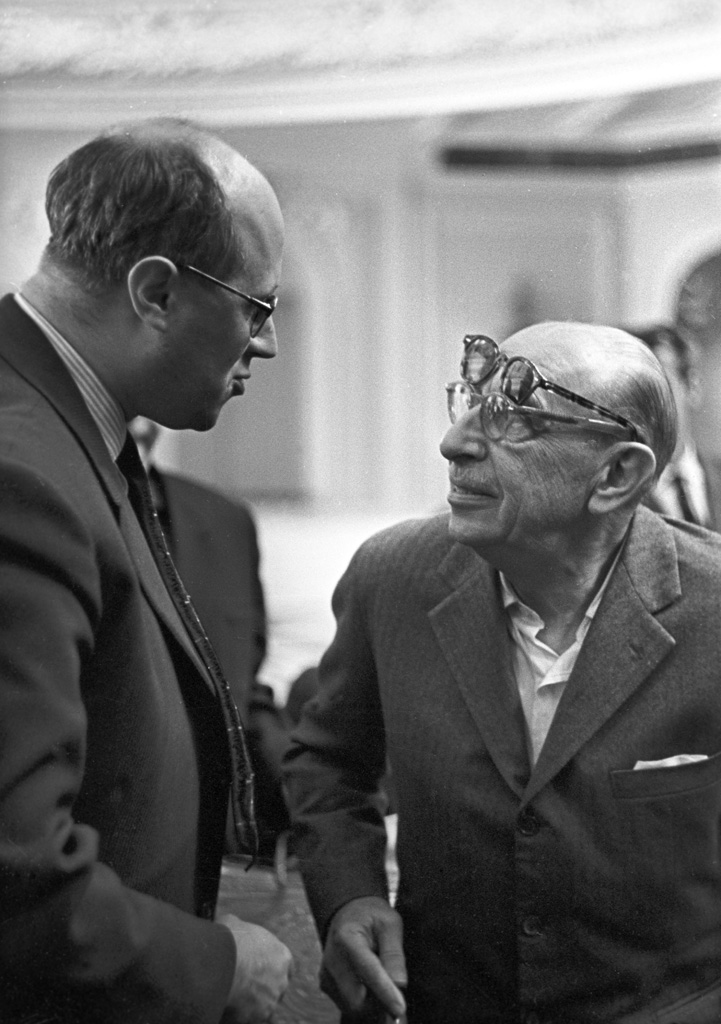
Stravinsky (right) with Mstislav Rostropovich in September 1962

Fanfare for a New Theatre is a 1964 composition for two trumpets by Russian composer Igor Stravinsky. It was premiered on April 19, 1964, and published by Boosey & Hawkes.

== Composition and premiere ==
This composition was written for the opening ceremony of the New York State Theater, as a part of the Lincoln Center for the Performing Arts. The two trumpets were meant to be placed at either side of the balcony, right at the entrance of the hall. Stravinsky dedicated it "To Lincoln and George", "Lincoln" being the company's administrator, Lincoln Kirstein, and "George" fellow entrepreneur and choreographer George Balanchine. Theodore Weis and Ronald K. Anderson were the performers.

== Analysis ==
The fanfare takes approximately 40 seconds to perform and is one of Stravinsky's major miniatures. The textures are canonic and recall Stravinsky's late twelve-tone technique. It is widely based on rhythmic patterns and the intervals between the two trumpets are brisk, atonal and uneven. The work consists of only one measure bar after the first unison motive. After this bar, the work is measured by systems.

The main form of the row of the melodic line, according to the twelve-tone technique, is played by both trumpets, but not simultaneously. This row works in a symmetrical way, given that both the four first and the four last intervals are the same, but in reversed order. The work shows a thorough usage of all inverted, retrograde, and retrograde-inverted rows.
