= Piano Sonata in F-sharp minor (Stravinsky) =

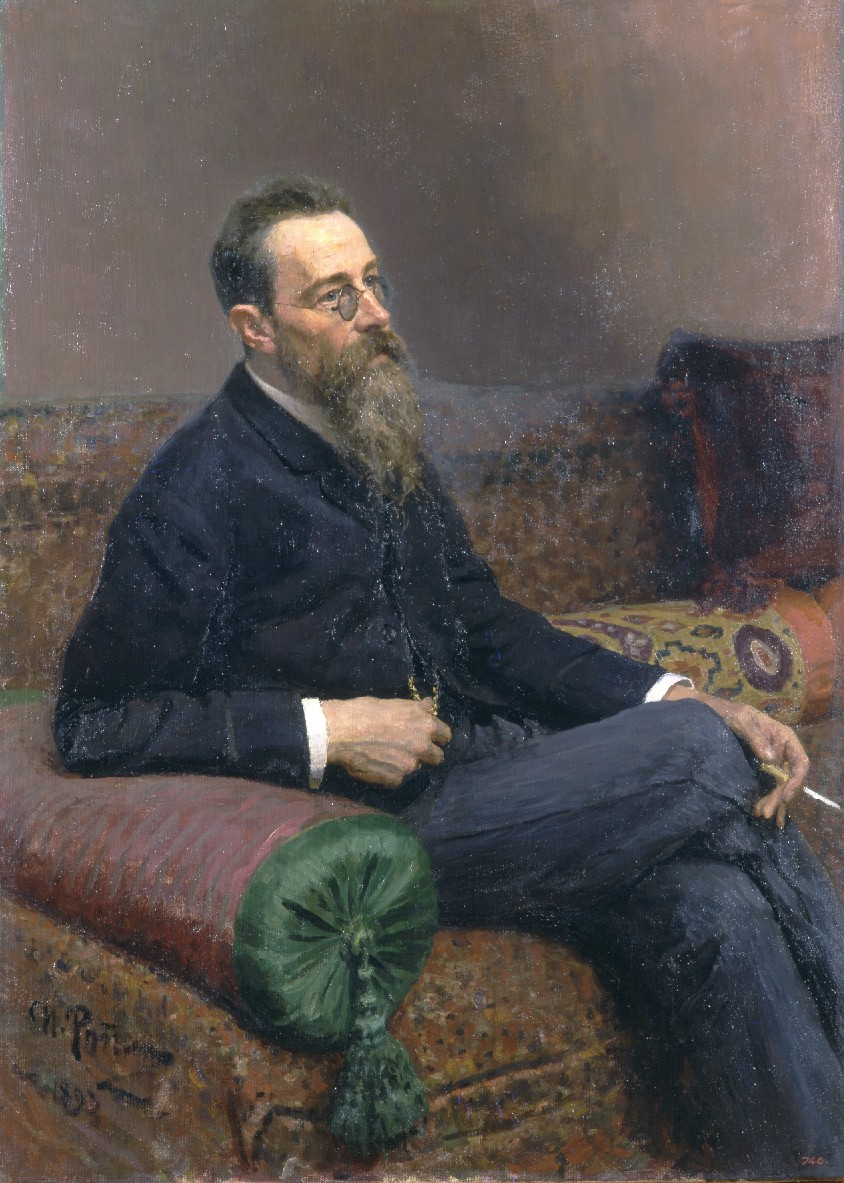
Portrait of Composer Nikolai Andreyevich Rimsky-Korsakov.

The Piano Sonata in F♯ minor is an early composition by Russian composer Igor Stravinsky. It was composed between 1903 and 1904 and is dedicated to Nicolas Richter.

== Composition ==
This piano sonata was kept in his portfolio together with his Scherzo in G minor for piano, a fairly short composition, when he was consulting his teacher Nikolai Rimsky-Korsakov about his ambition to be a composer. It was eventually composed partly in Saint Petersburg and partly in Pavlovka, in Samara.

Both the sonata and the scherzo were dedicated to fellow pianist and contemporary Nicolas Richter, who played it in private to Rimsky-Korsakov in 1905 and subsequently gave a performance in public as a premiere the same year.

Prior to his death, it was thought all Stravinsky's compositions prior to the Symphony in E♭ had been lost when he left Russia in 1914, with the exception of The Mushrooms Going to War, the manuscript of which remained with him until his death. Stravinsky even referred to this piano sonata in his autobiography Memories and Commentaries as "the lost – fortunately lost – piano sonata", for he considered it was just an imitation of late Beethoven. He was not informed, even when he returned to Russia in 1962, visiting Moscow and Leningrad, that most of his early compositions, including this sonata, were in the safekeeping of the Leningrad State Public Library. They were eventually published posthumously in 1973. However, this work remained obscured until Stravinsky's widow, Vera de Bosset, authorised its publication.

== Structure ==
This piano sonata in F♯ minor consists of four movements, the last two being united by an attacca. A typical performance lasts between 25 and 30 minutes. The movements are as follows:

1. Allegro
2. Scherzo (Vivo in the authorised publication)
3. Andante
4. Finale. Allegro – Andante
