= Three Easy Pieces (Stravinsky) =

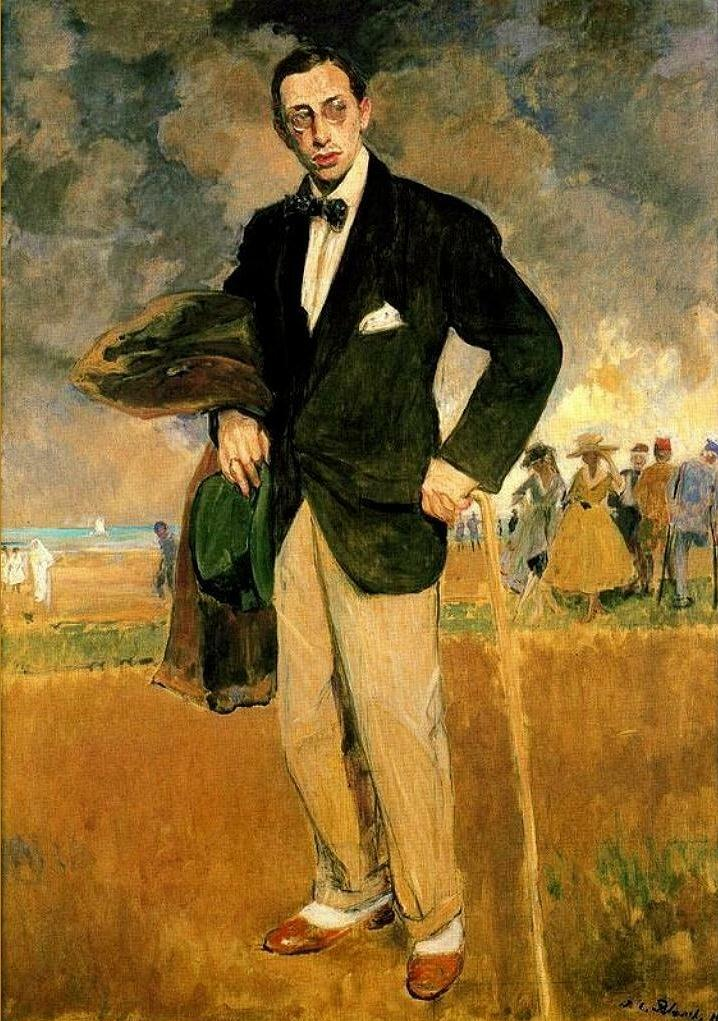
Portrait of Igor Stravinsky by Jacques-Émile Blanche (1915)

Three Easy Pieces, also referred to by its original French title Trois pièces faciles, is a collection of pieces for four hands by Russian composer Igor Stravinsky. It was finished in 1915 and was published as a set in the winter of 1917.

== Composition ==
Stravinsky's Three Easy Pieces can be understood as an example of Gebrauchsmusik, that is, music that was conceived and composed specifically for some purpose, and not for its own sake. In this case, Stravinsky wrote this set and 1917 Five Easy Pieces especially for educational purposes. After completing his Valse des fleurs, which is similar to them in the sense that they were composed for his little children to play with him, Stravinsky decided to write pieces for four hands to teach them how to play the piano. The set was composed in Clarens, in 1914 and 1915 and was presented and first performed by José Iturbi, on April 22, 1918. It was eventually published in 1917.

== Analysis ==
The Three Easy Pieces take approximately three minutes to perform. The pieces are:

1. March
2. Waltz
3. Polka

Even though they are titled as "easy", only the left part is easy, the right hand sustaining the whole burden of the composition. In this case, the secondo has only one staff and uses both hands to play ostinato parts. The set features an overtly satirical character, in contrast to its twin set, which is much more serious and displays much more insight into Stravinsky's compositional method. Stravinsky once referred to them as "popcorn".

== Arrangements ==
Stravinsky himself made a number of arrangements of these three pieces. Upon completing the set in 1915, Stravinsky made a first transcription of the Polka for cimbalom and for cimbalom and a small ensemble. Later that year, he also arranged the March for twelve instruments and the Waltz for seven instruments. However, only the solo cimbalom version of the Polka was selected for publication. In 1921, Stravinsky reworked the three movements and arranged them for small orchestra, and published them as the first three movements in Suite No. 2.

=== Polka and Valse ===
Igor's son, Soulima Stravinsky, also wrote two small arrangements for solo piano, which were published in 1977. Polka was dedicated to Sergei Diaghilev, and retains most of the composer's original material, with three additional bars at the beginning, making it a total of 43 bars long. Marked "Moderato" at the beginning, the piece is in a constant 2/4. Valse, on the other hand, an arrangement of "Waltz", was dedicated to Eric Satie. Marked "Tempo giusto" in the score, it is 99 bars long and has an ABACA structure (the C part being the Trio). It is in C major and 3/4. Both arrangements require grace notes to be played before the beat. They were published by Boosey & Hawkes.

== See also ==
- Five Easy Pieces
