= Three Pieces for Solo Clarinet =

Composition for clarinet solo by Igor Stravinsky

Stravinsky as drawn by Pablo Picasso in 1920

Three Pieces for Solo Clarinet is a solo instrumental work by Igor Stravinsky. The work was composed in 1918. It was published in 1919, shortly after the completion of his Suite from L'Histoire du Soldat, as a thank-you gift to the philanthropist and arts patron Werner Reinhart, who was also an amateur clarinetist. The Three Pieces is perhaps the most well-known work for unaccompanied clarinet in the repertoire. It is also notable for being one of the few clarinet solo pieces that calls for clarinets in both B♭ and A.

== Analysis ==
=== I (Preferably Clarinet in A) ===
The first piece started out as a song Stravinsky began writing in 1916. It is marked "Sempre p e molto tranquillo", or "Always piano and very peaceful". The tempo is marked at = 52, making it by far the slowest of the three pieces. It is made up of a long, plodding series of quarter and eighth notes, adorned by the occasional grace notes and often interrupted by a breath mark. The lower register of the clarinet is explored here, with many leaps going from the upper to the lower registers of the instrument. The last measure is marked "poco più f e poco più mosso", or "A little more forte and a little more motion". This last measure is to be played much quicker and at a louder dynamic so as to create a contrast with the rest of the piece. A sustained concert C ends the first piece in a long fade-out.

=== II (Preferably Clarinet in A) ===
The second piece is written in a free-form style, akin to jazz improvisation, with no time signature or bar lines. The indicated tempo is = 168, with an eighth note being treated as three sixteenth notes. The piece can be segmented into three sections. The first is a flurry of sextuplets and thirty-second notes that are extremely technically challenging. The second section is quieter and calmer, with the clarinetist playing fast eighth notes in the lower register. The third section is a recapitulation of the first, bringing back the same sextuplet patterns from earlier. The second piece also ends softly, with a sudden change from a f to p dynamic.

=== III (Preferably Clarinet in B♭) ===
The third piece is inspired by the ragtime from the L'Histoire du Soldat Suite, and is the only one to call for clarinet in B♭ instead of in A. With a metronome marking of = 160, the piece is characterized by much rapid syncopation and frequently shifting time signatures, made more complicated by the accents placed on certain notes. It maintains a near-constant f dynamic until the very end, where the player backs down to a softer dynamic and ending with one final grace note.
