= Symphony in E-flat (Stravinsky) =

Symphony by Igor Stravinsky

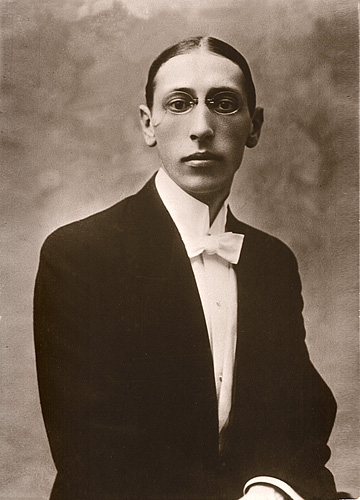
Igor Stravinsky c. 1905

The Symphony in E♭, Op. 1, is the first published work composed by Igor Stravinsky during his apprenticeship with Nikolai Rimsky-Korsakov. It is also his first composition for orchestra. Of classical structure, it is broadly influenced by Rimsky-Korsakov, Glazunov, Tchaikovsky and Wagner. It was composed in 1905–1907 and revised in 1913. It lasts for about forty minutes.

== History ==
The score bears the dedication "To my dear teacher N. A. Rimsky-Korsakov". A private performance was given on 27 April 1907 by the St. Petersburg Court Orchestra conducted by H. Wahrlich, in a concert that also included the first performance of Faun and Shepherdess. Stravinsky later recalled that both Rimsky-Korsakov and Glazunov considered the orchestration "too heavy". The first public performance was conducted by Felix Blumenfeld on 22 January 1908. A revised version was conducted by Ernest Ansermet on 2 April 1914, and the composer conducted this version in his later performances.

== Instrumentation ==
The symphony is scored for 3 flutes (3rd doubling piccolo), 2 oboes, 3 clarinets, 2 bassoons, 4 horns, 3 trumpets, 3 trombones, tuba, timpani, percussion and strings.

== Movements ==
=== I. Allegro moderato ===
The first movement is in sonata form.

=== II. Scherzo ===
This movement was sometimes played alone at performances of the Ballets Russes. Stravinsky incorporated into it a Russian folk song similar to one he used in Petrushka.

=== III. Largo ===
The longest movement of the symphony, lasting almost fifteen minutes.

=== IV. Finale ===
The finale is a rondo. As in the second movement, Stravinsky includes a popular song ("Tchitcher-Yatcher"). He used it again in his Trois petites chansons of 1913.

== Discography ==
- Stravinsky's recording of this symphony in his collected works on Sony Classical was recorded by the Columbia Symphony Orchestra in May 1966.
