= Serenade (Stravinsky) =

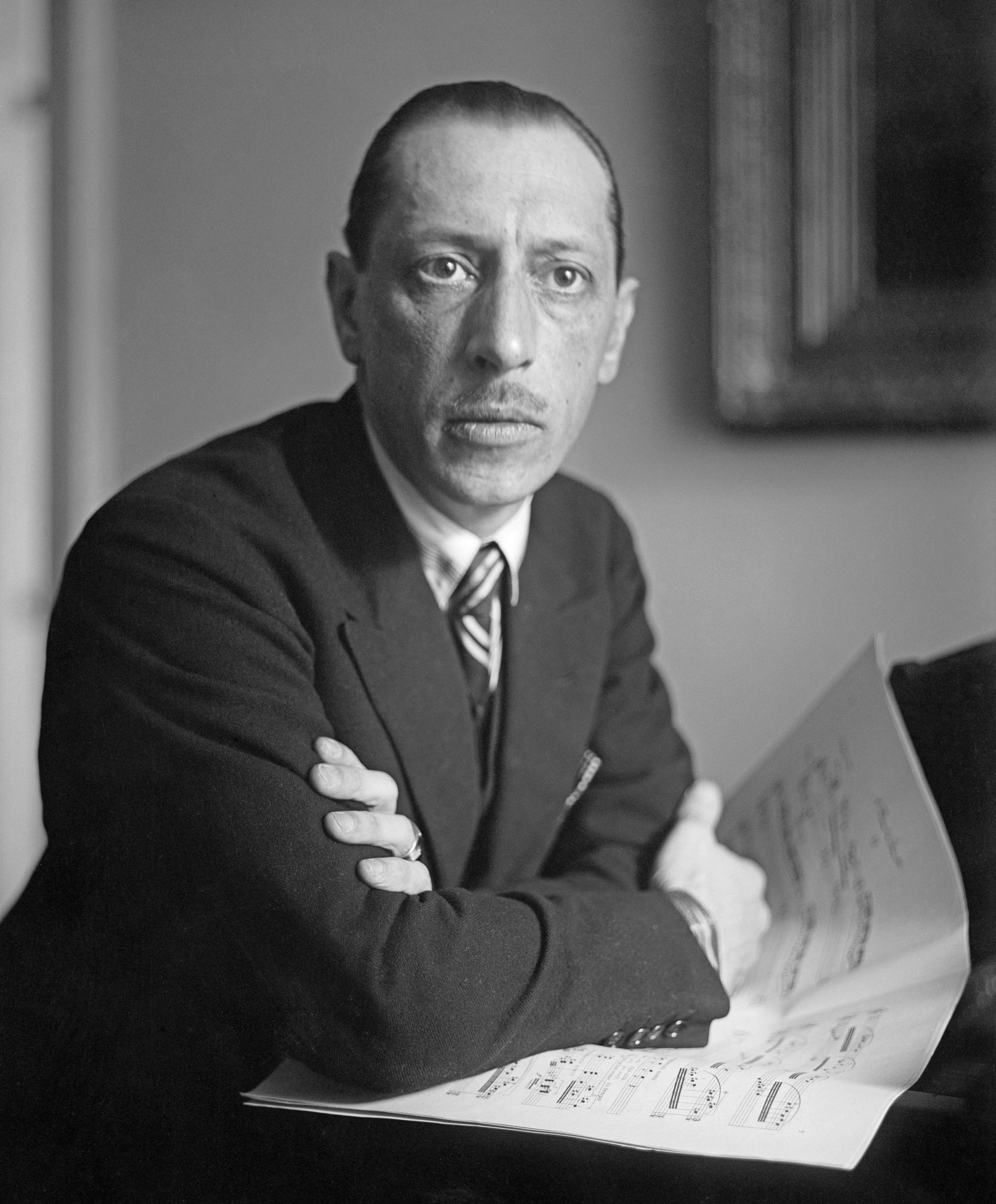
Igor Stravinsky in the 1920s

Serenade in A is a work for solo piano by Russian composer Igor Stravinsky. Completed on September 9, 1925, in Vienna and published by Boosey & Hawkes, it resulted from his signing his first gramophone recording contract, for Brunswick, and was written so that each movement could fit on one side of a 78 rpm record. The dedicatee was Stravinsky's wife Yekaterina.

== Structure ==
Serenade in A lasts about twelve minutes and is in four movements:

1. Hymne (Hymn)
2. Romanza (Romance)
3. Rondoletto
4. Cadenza finala (Final cadence)

Despite its title, the work is in neither A major nor A minor. According to Eric White, A is not the "key" of the work, but rather the music radiates from and tends towards A as a "tonic pole". Thus, the first and the last chord of each movement contains the note A, either as the root, third, or fifth of a triad. According to Stravinsky, the piece was conceived "in imitation of the Nachtmusik of the eighteenth century, which was usually commissioned by patron princes for various festive occasions, and included, as did the suites, an indeterminate number of pieces". Therefore, the movement titles are meant to evoke the specific parts of such festive celebration.

From the pianist's perspective, "Hymne" is related to Frédéric Chopin's Ballade No. 2, while the Cadenza finala reflects Stravinsky's Russian heritage.
