= Three Pieces for String Quartet =

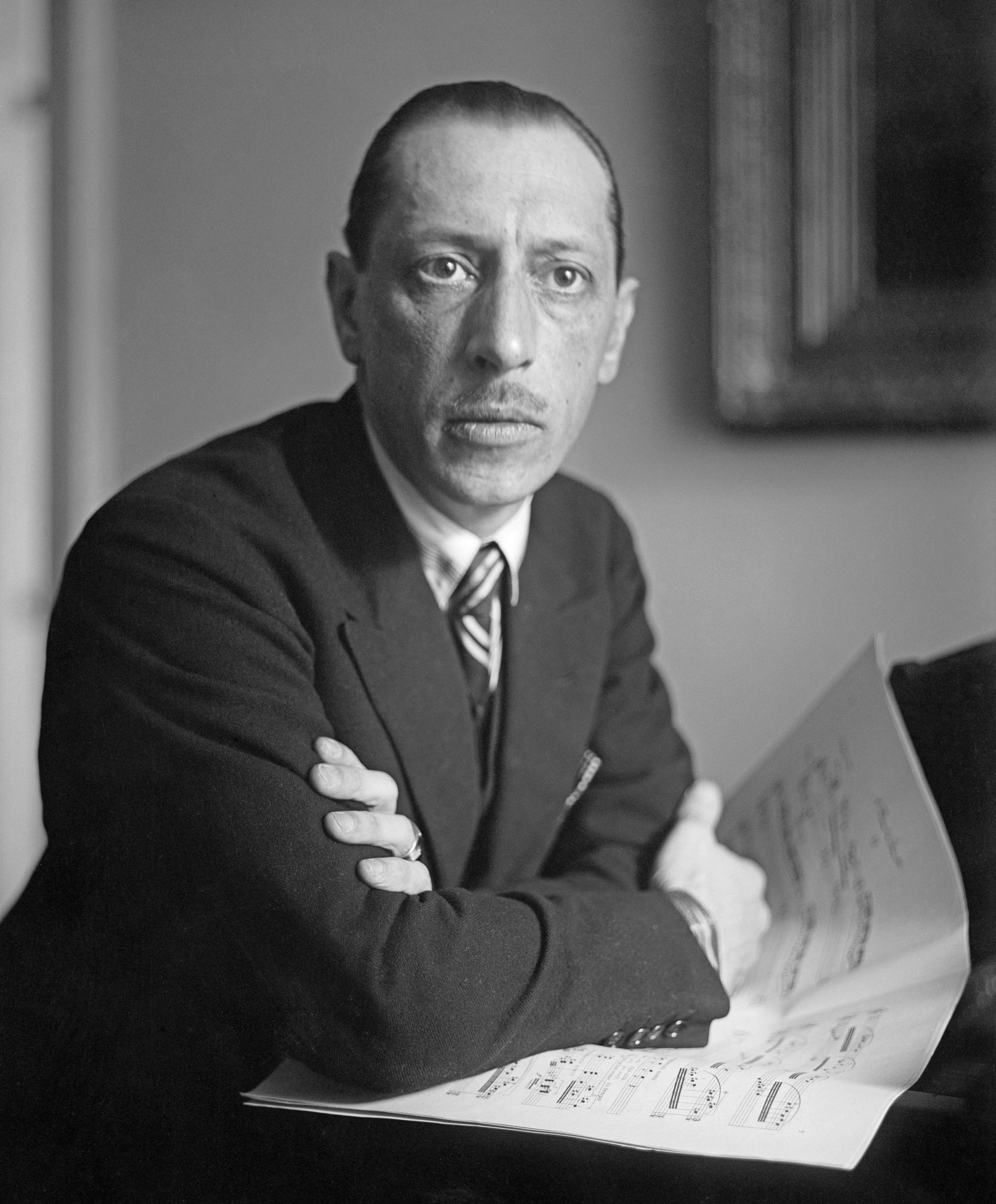
Igor Stravinsky in the 1920s.

Three Pieces for String Quartet is a composition by Russian composer Igor Stravinsky. It was finished in 1914, revised in 1918, and eventually published in 1922.

== Composition ==
As most of the works by Igor Stravinsky, this three-movement work was arranged from a four-hands one-piano version, from which the final revised version of 1918 derives and differs in some respects. The manuscript (originally titled IStravinsky. Trois pièces pour quatuor à cordes – reduction pour piano à quatre mains par moi, IStr.) contained no movement titles for any of the three pieces. However, with the passing of time, Stravinsky rearranged these three movements for large orchestra, together with his Étude pour pianola, and premiered the whole collection as Quatre études in 1928.

The term string quartet in the title refers to string quartet more as an ensemble, rather than a genre. Therefore, the work challenges the traditional notion of string quartet with its implied musical form and idiom. As music critic Paul Griffiths points out,

Stravinsky's work, for the first time in the history of the genre, is determinedly not a 'string quartet' but a series of pieces to be played by four strings. There is no acknowledgement of a tradition or a form, and the lack of any such acknowledgement seems iconoclastic because of our own experience of the genre's traditions. The notion of quartet dialogue has no place here, nor have subtleties of blend: the texture is completely fragmented, with each instrument sounding for itself.

== Structure ==
This collection of pieces takes approximately seven minutes to perform. There are three movements:

1. (later titled "Danse" in Quatre études)
2. (later titled "Excentrique" in Quatre études)
3. (later titled "Cantique" in Quatre études)
