= Helga Pilarczyk =

German operatic soprano

- Helga Pilarczyk, in the 1950s
- Born: 12 March 1925; Schöningen, Weimar Republic
- Died: 15 September 2011 (aged 86); Hamburg, Germany
- Education: Musikhochschule Hamburg
- Occupation: Operatic soprano

Helga Pilarczyk (12 March 1925 – 15 September 2011) was a German operatic soprano.

== Biography ==
Born in Schöningen, she originally trained as a pianist, at Braunschweig and at the Musikhochschule Hamburg. However, she made her debut as a contralto at the Staatstheater Braunschweig, as Irmentraud in Lortzing's Der Waffenschmied in 1951. By 1954 to 1955, she emerged as a dramatic soprano at the Hamburg State Opera, where she remained until the 1966/67 season.

Pilarczyk became a specialist in works of the twentieth century, including works by Richard Strauss, Salome and Die Frau ohne Schatten (as the Dyer's Wife), Prokofiev's The Fiery Angel, Luigi Dallapiccola's Il prigioniero, Stravinsky's Oedipus rex and The Flood, Alban Berg's Wozzeck and Lulu, and Schoenberg's Erwartung and Von heute auf morgen. She appeared in Zürich, Berlin, at the Royal Opera House, Covent Garden (as Salome in 1958), Florence (Erwartung and Wozzeck), the Glyndebourne Festival (as Composer in Ariadne auf Naxos by Strauss, 1958), Paris Opéra (Wozzeck, 1963, and Von heute auf morgen, 1967), La Scala (Lulu, then The Flood, both in 1963), and Vienna.

In 1965, she debuted both at the Metropolitan Opera (Wozzeck, under Karl Böhm) and in Chicago (Wozzeck, with Sir Geraint Evans, under Bruno Bartoletti). In 1967, she left the stage in order to devote herself to her family, and later taught at the Musikhochschule Hamburg.

Her discography consists principally of recordings of Erwartung (conducted by Hermann Scherchen and Robert Craft, both in 1960) and Pierrot lunaire (conducted by Pierre Boulez in 1961). Opera Depot has issued her 1963 performance of Puccini's Il tabarro, conducted by Alberto Erede, on Compact Disc.

The Kammersängerin died, following a brief illness, in Hamburg, at the age of eighty-six, leaving behind two children. Helga Pilarczyk is buried in Hamburg.
