= Dorothy Dow =

American singer (1920–2005)

Dorothy Dow (8 October 1920 – 26 February 2005) was an American classical dramatic soprano who had an active international career in concerts, operas, and recitals during the 1940s through the 1960s. After retiring from the stage in 1968, she embarked on a second career as an academic.

== Biography ==
Dow was born in Houston, Texas. She studied at the Juilliard School in New York City, graduating with a bachelor's degree in vocal performance in 1942. She quickly became one of the leading concert sopranos in the United States, singing with orchestras throughout the country and giving a number of highly lauded recitals. She made her first appearance on the opera stage in Buffalo, New York as Santuzza in Cavalleria rusticana in 1946. Her first major critical success was singing the role of Brünnhilde in a concert version of Richard Wagner's Götterdämmerung with the Philadelphia Orchestra under Eugene Ormandy in 1947.

As an opera singer, Dow's career was more centered in Europe than in the United States. She was engaged at the Zürich Opera from 1948 to 1950. She was a frequent guest at La Scala during the 1950s and 1960s, singing there Chrysothemis in Richard Strauss's Elektra, Elisabeth in Wagner's Tannhäuser, the title role in La Gioconda, Judith in Bluebeard's Castle, Marie in Wozzeck and Cressida in William Walton's Troilus and Cressida among other roles. In 1952 she made her first appearance at the Glyndebourne Festival as Lady Macbeth in Giuseppe Verdi's Macbeth. She returned to Glyndebourne the following year to sing the title role in Strauss's Ariadne auf Naxos. In 1954 she sang Irmengard in Spontini’s Agnes von Hohenstaufen at Teatro della Pergola. In 1955 she sang the role of Renata in a critically acclaimed production of Sergei Prokofiev's The Fiery Angel at La Fenice.

Although Dow made few opera appearances in the United States, the ones she did make were notable. In May 1947, she portrayed the role of Susan B. Anthony in the world premiere of Virgil Thomson’s The Mother of Us All at Columbia University’s Branders Matthews Hall. In 1951 she sang the Woman in the United States premiere of Arnold Schoenberg’s Erwartung in Washington, D.C.

In 1968, Dow retired from her singing career. She embarked on a second career as an academic, earning further degrees in history and humanities from the University of Texas at Austin, Columbia University and New York University. She joined the faculty at Rutgers University where she taught history for many years. She died in Galveston, aged 84.
