= Erwartung =

1909 opera by Arnold Schönberg

- Monodrama by Arnold Schönberg
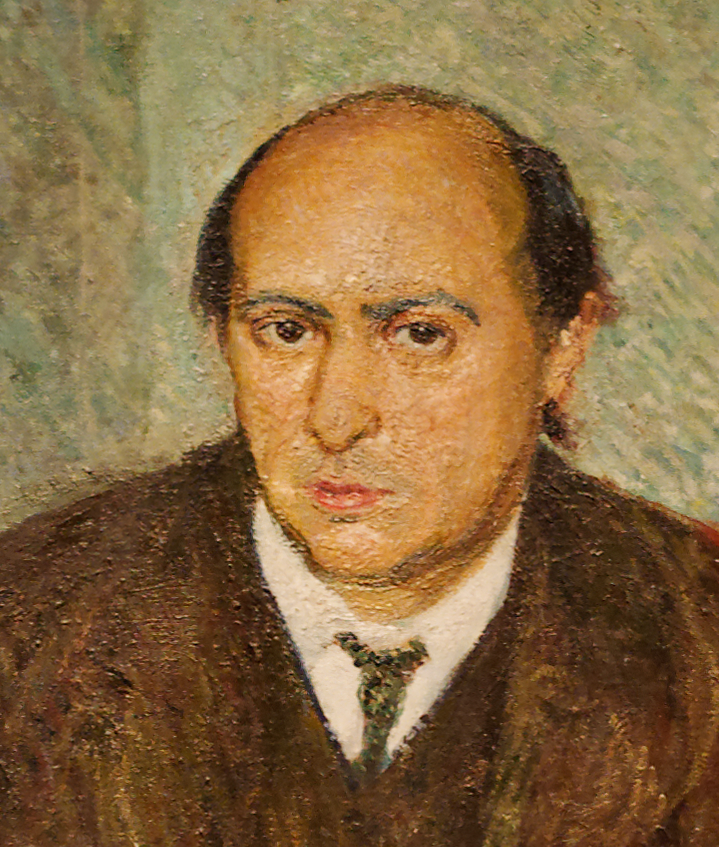
- The composer portrayed in 1907
- Translation: Expectation
- Librettist: Marie Pappenheim
- Language: German
- Premiere: 6 June 1924; New German Theatre, Prague

Erwartung (Expectation), Op. 17, is a one-act monodrama in four scenes by Arnold Schönberg to a libretto by Marie Pappenheim. Composed in 1909, it was not premiered until 6 June 1924 in Prague, conducted by Alexander Zemlinsky with Marie Gutheil-Schoder as the soprano. The opera takes the unusual form of a monologue for solo soprano accompanied by a large orchestra. In performance, it lasts for about half an hour. Schönberg described Erwartung, saying "the aim is to represent in slow motion everything that occurs during a single second of maximum spiritual excitement, stretching it out to half an hour."

Philip Friedheim has described Erwartung as Schönberg's "only lengthy work in an athematic style", where no musical material returns once stated over the course of 426 measures. In his analysis of the structure, one indication of the complexity of the music is that the first scene of over 30 bars contains 9 metre changes and 16 tempo changes. Herbert Buchanan has countered this description of the work as "athematic", and the general impression of it as "atonal", in his own analysis.

The musicologist Charles Rosen has said that Erwartung, along with Berg's Wozzeck and Stravinsky's The Rite of Spring, is among the "impregnable" "great monuments of modernism." According to Christopher Small, "Schoenberg's intuitive understanding of the integrative process of dreams is revealed especially in the marvellous closing pages, filled as they are with tenderness and longing. At the end we can almost see the sleeper awake as with a scurry of chromatic scales the music vanished from our hearing and the dream recedes from her waking mind."

== Performance history ==
Erwartung had its British premiere on 9 January 1931, with the BBC Symphony Orchestra conducted by the composer.

It was the first live opera shown on Times Square in New York City in a production by Robin Rhode in November 2015 (2 performances).

== Roles ==
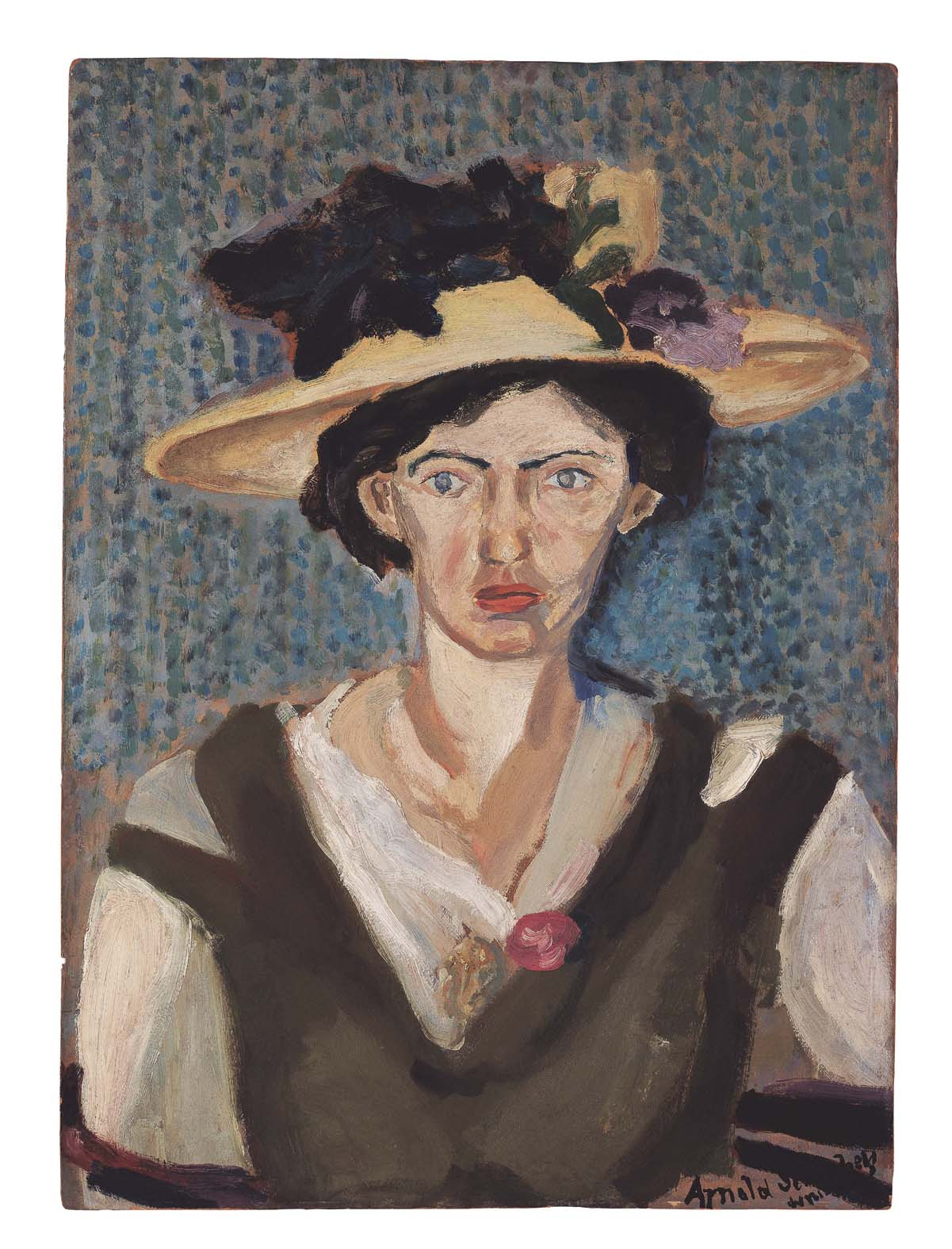
Mizzi Pappenheim, the librettist portrayed by Schönberg, 1909

- The Woman (soprano)

== Synopsis ==
Time: Night
Place: A forest

A woman is in an apprehensive state as she searches for her lover. In the darkness, she comes across what she first thinks is a body, but then realises is a tree-trunk. She is frightened and becomes more anxious as she cannot find the man she is looking for. She then finds a dead body, and sees that it is her lover. She calls out for assistance, but there is no response. She tries to revive him, and addresses him as if he were still alive, angrily charging him with being unfaithful to her. She then asks herself what she is to do with her life, as her lover is now dead. Finally, she wanders off alone into the night.

== Instrumentation ==
Erwartung's score calls for an orchestra with the following instrumentation.

| Woodwind 3 Flutes (3rd doubling on 2nd piccolo) Piccolo 4 Oboes (4th doubling on English horn) 4 Clarinets: 1 in D, 1 in B♭, 2 in A Bass clarinet in B♭ 3 Bassoons Contrabassoon Brass 4 Horns in F 3 Trumpets in B♭ 4 Trombones Tuba | Percussion Timpani Xylophone Glockenspiel Cymbals Bass drum Side drum Triangle Tam-tam Rattle | Keyboard Celesta Strings Harp Violins I and II Violas Cellos Double basses |

== Recordings (selection) ==
- Columbia: Dorothy Dow; New York Philharmonic-Symphony Orchestra; Dimitri Mitropoulos, conductor (1951)
- Orfeo: Magda László; Symphonieorchester des Bayerischen Rundfunks; Hermann Scherchen, conductor (1955)
- Wergo: Helga Pilarczyk; North West German Philharmonic; Hermann Scherchen, conductor (1960)
- Columbia: Helga Pilarczyk; Washington Opera Society Orchestra; Robert Craft, conductor (p. 1963)
- Q Disc: Dorothy Dorow; Concertgebouw Orchestra; Sir Bernard Haitink, conductor (1975)
- CRI: Susan Davenny-Wyner; Orchestra of the 20th Century; Arthur Weisberg, conductor (1975)
- CBS: Janis Martin; BBC Symphony Orchestra; Pierre Boulez, conductor (1977)
- Decca: Anja Silja; Wiener Philharmoniker; Christoph von Dohnányi, conductor (1979)
- Philips: Jessye Norman; Metropolitan Opera Orchestra; James Levine, conductor (1989)
- EMI Classics: Phyllis Bryn-Julson; City of Birmingham Symphony Orchestra; Sir Simon Rattle, conductor (1993)
- Teldec: Alessandra Marc; Sächsische Staatskapelle Dresden; Giuseppe Sinopoli, conductor (1996)
- Hungaroton: Éva Marton; Budapest Symphony Orchestra; John Carewe, conductor (1998)
- KOCH International Classics: Anja Silja; Philharmonia Orchestra; Robert Craft, conductor (2000)
- Hänssler/PROFIL: Jeanne-Michèle Charbonnet; WDR Sinfonieorchester Köln; Jukka-Pekka Saraste, conductor (2012)
- Chandos: Sara Jakubiak; Bergen Philharmonic Orchestra; Edward Gardner, conductor (2020)
