= The Mother of Us All =

Opera by Virgil Thomson

- Opera by Virgil Thomson
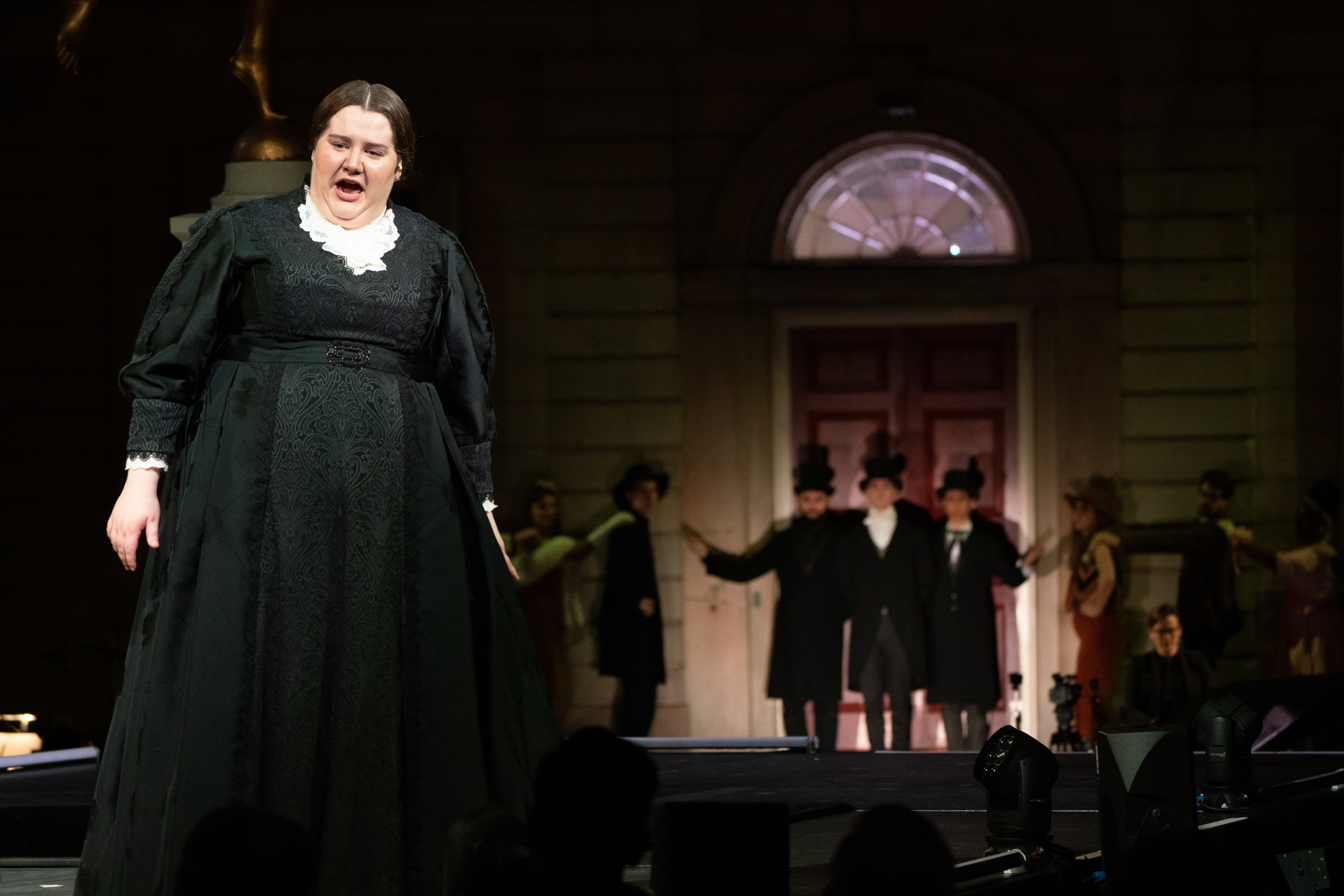
- Scene from a 2020 performance at the Metropolitan Museum of Art
- Librettist: Gertrude Stein
- Language: English
- Based on: life of Susan B. Anthony
- Premiere: 7 May 1947; Brander Matthews Hall, Columbia University

The Mother of Us All is a two-act opera composed by Virgil Thomson to a libretto by Gertrude Stein. Thomson and Stein met in 1945 to begin the writing process, almost twenty years after their first collaborative project, the opera Four Saints in Three Acts. Stein wrote the libretto in the winter of 1945–46 before sending it to Thomson in March. After Stein's death in July, Thomson began working on the score, which he finished within just a few months. The opera centers around Susan B. Anthony, one of the major figures in the fight for women's suffrage in the United States, with a supporting cast of characters both fictional and based on other historical figures. Thomson famously described the work as a "pageant". It premiered on 7 May 1947 at Columbia University.

== Composition ==
According to experts, Gertrude Stein's exploration of rhythm and repetition within her writing lent itself to a musical setting. Both her libretto and Thomson's orchestration were highly idiomatic, matching patriotic dialogue with "hymns, marches, patriotic airs, and parlor songs" in order to emulate the atmosphere of America's 19th century political scene. Scholars claim that these folk influences are what mark Thomson's score as acutely American. Contrary to Four Saints in Three Acts, the focus of The Mother of Us All was on distinctly characterizing each political player—Thomson gave each a particular musical identity through his melody and orchestration. "Some characters are associated with specific instruments, most noticeably Susan B., who is associated with trumpets and strings, but also Angel Moore with the harp, and Daniel Webster with horns." Susan's trumpet melodies are "possibly meant to convey her militant dedication to her cause," and the character of Angel Moore, being a literal angel, is accompanied with the instrument most often associate with heaven. Though he still worked within a traditional tonal framework, Thomson was highly influenced by serialism and other contemporary musical ideas. The opera's duration is around 103 minutes.

== Instrumentation ==
The work is scored for one flute, one oboe, two clarinets, one bassoon, two French horns, two trumpets, one trombone, two percussionists, harp, celesta, piano, and strings. The cast consists of two sopranos, one alto, two tenors, one baritone, and one bass, with twenty five singers and six additional silent actors. When the piece was originally commissioned in 1945, Thomson was asked to orchestrate the piece for less than twenty players, since World War II made it difficult to recruit musicians. His chamber ensemble and solo piano reductions of the opera's orchestration are frequently performed.

== Performance history ==
The opera premiered on 7 May 1947 at Columbia University's Brander Matthews Hall with soprano Dorothy Dow as Susan B. Anthony. Soprano Shirlee Emmons was awarded an Obie Award for her portrayal of Susan B. Anthony in the 1956 Off-Broadway production. The opera was mounted at Carnegie Hall by the American Opera Society in 1964 with Johanna Meier as Susan B. Anthony, Betty Allen as Anne, Thomas Paul as Daniel Webster, and Enrico Di Giuseppe as John Quincy Adams. The Santa Fe Opera mounted the work in 1976 and released a recording of the work the following year on the New World Records label. The European premiere took place in Kensington Town Hall in London on 26 June 1979. The New York City Opera staged a production in 2000 with Lauren Flanigan as Susan B. Anthony. In 2003, San Francisco Opera opened its 80th anniversary season with a new production of The Mother of Us All, Luana DeVol assuming the role of Susan B. Anthony for the first time.

== Roles ==
Role	Voice type	Premiere cast 7 May 1947 (Conductor: Otto Luening)
Susan B. Anthony	mezzo-soprano or dramatic soprano	Dorothy Dow
Anne	contralto	Belva Kibler
Gertrude S.	soprano	Hazel Gravell
Virgil T.	baritone	Robert Grooters
Daniel Webster	bass	Bertram Rowe
Andrew Johnson	tenor	
Thaddeus Stevens	tenor	Alfred Kunz
Jo the Loiterer	tenor	William Horne
Chris the Citizen	baritone	Carlton Sunday
Indiana Elliot	contralto	Ruth Krug
Angel More	soprano	Carolyn Blakeslee
Henrietta M.	soprano	Teresa Stich-Randall
Henry B.	bass-baritone	Jacques La Rochelle
Anthony Comstock	bass	James Chartrand
John Adams, presumably John Quincy Adams	tenor	Robert Sprecher
Constance Fletcher	mezzo-soprano	Alice Howland
Gloster Heming	baritone	Michael Therry
Isabel Wentworth	mezzo-soprano	Jean Handzlik
Anna Hope	contralto	Carlton Sunday
Lillian Russell	soprano	Nancy Reid
Jenny Reefer	mezzo-soprano	Dianna Herman
Ulysses S. Grant	bass-baritone	Everett Anderson
Herman Atlan	high baritone	
Donald Gallup	baritone	
A.A. and T.T., page boys or postillions		
Negro Man and Negro Woman		
Indiana Elliot's Brother	bass-baritone	William Elliott Savage

== Synopsis ==
Stein's text for The Mother of Us All does not describe details of staging. Therefore, Thomson's partner Maurice Grosser devised a scenario to facilitate staging the opera. Though Grosser stated that other scenarios were equally possible, his scenario is published in the printed score; this synopsis is based on it.

=== Act 1 ===
Scene 1. Susan B. Anthony and her devoted companion Anne are shown at home. Anne is knitting; Susan B. is pasting clippings into a scrapbook. Gertrude S. and Virgil T. also appear as narrators.

Scene 2. A political meeting takes place, at which Webster, Johnson, Adams, Grant, Comstock, and Stevens are all present. Jo the Loiterer and Chris the Citizen also appear, mocking the politicians' solemnity. Susan B. introduces herself to the assembly, and she and Daniel Webster debate.

Scene 3. A public square in front of Susan B. Anthony's house. Thaddeus Stevens argues with Andrew Johnson; there is a flowery love scene between John Adams and Constance Fletcher. Jenny Reefer begins waltzing with Herman Atlan, and everyone joins in the dance.

Scene 4. Susan B. Anthony meditates on the difficulties of her mission.

Scene 5. Jo the Loiterer and Indiana Elliot are to be married. As the wedding party gathers, various episodes unfold. John Adams courts Constance Fletcher, Daniel Webster (who is to perform the ceremony) addresses Angel More in sentimental language. Indiana's brother bursts in, wishing to prevent the marriage, and Susan B. explains what marriage means to women. General Grant calls for order, and Jo teases him for his pomposity. It seems that the wedding is all but forgotten, but finally Daniel Webster blesses the couple and Susan B. foretells that all of their children, men and women, will have the vote.

=== Act 2 ===
Scene 1. Susan B.'s home. Susan B. is doing housework when she learns that she will be asked to address a political meeting. Jo the Loiterer complains that Indiana Elliot refuses to take his last name. When Susan B. is invited to speak, she declines, then agrees, hesitates again, but finally goes off to the meeting.

Scene 2. The meeting has taken place and Susan B. returns home triumphantly. She has spoken so convincingly that the politicians, now afraid of the women's suffrage movement, have written the word "male" into the Constitution in order to make it impossible for women to vote. Indiana Elliot has decided to take Jo's last name, and he will take hers; they will become Jo Elliot and Indiana Loiterer. Everyone congratulates Susan B. for her leadership.

Scene 3 (Epilogue). Some years later, a statue of Susan B. Anthony is to be unveiled at the U. S. Capitol. The characters gather for the ceremony, with Anne as guest of honor. Susan B. enters as a ghost, though Anne does not see her. Constance Fletcher appears, now almost blind. Other characters talk about women's suffrage, or burst in tipsily. The ceremony threatens to get out of hand. Suddenly, Virgil T. unveils the statue. The women lay wreaths at the base of the pedestal. All slowly depart. Alone, Susan B. Anthony (as the statue) sings of the struggles and lessons of her long life.

== Recordings ==
- Virgil Thomson: The Mother of Us All – Mignon Dunn, Philip Booth, Karen Beck, Sondra Stowe, Jimmie Lu Null, William Lewis, Steven Loewengart, Thomas Parker, Marla McDaniels, D'Artagnan Petty, Stephen Bryant, Ashley Putnam, et al.; Conductor: Raymond Leppard; Santa Fe Opera Orchestra and Chorus. Recorded in Santa Fe, New Mexico, 1976—recorded digitally (America's first digital recording session) but released from the superior analog master made at the same time. Label: New World Records
- Virgil Thomson: The Mother of Us All – Noragh Devlin (as Susan B. Anthony), Scott Russell (Daniel Webster), Alexander Frankel (Jo the Loiterer), Addison Hamilton (Constance Fletcher), Carlton Moe (John Adams), et al.; Conductor: Steven Osgood; Manhattan Opera Orchestra. Recorded in New York City, 2013; released 2014. Label: Albany Records.
- Virgil Thomson: The Mother of Us All – Dorothy Dow (as Susan B. Anthony), Belva Kibler (Anne), Hazel Gravell (Gertrude S.), Robert Grooters (Virgil T.), Bertrand Rowe (Daniel Webster), William Horne (tenor) (Jo the Loiterer), et al.; Conductor: Virgil Thomson; Columbia University Chorus and Orchestra. Recorded in New York City, May 7, 1947 – world premiere performance; released 2017. Label: Cantus Classics.

== Sources ==
Virgil Thomson: Composer on the Aisle. Anthony Tommasini. W. W. Norton. ISBN 0-393-31858-3
