= Pilgrims and Pioneers =

Symphonic poem by Virgil Thomson

Pilgrims and Pioneers is a symphonic poem written by the American composer Virgil Thomson. The music was originally composed as a score to the one-reel immigration film Journey to America, which was made for the 1964 New York World's Fair by Thomson's frequent collaborator John Houseman. However, Thomas later adapted the music for concert performances under the title Pilgrims and Pioneers. This version was first performed by the Mozart Festival Orchestra conducted by Baird Hastings on February 27, 1971.

== Composition ==
Pilgrims and Pioneers is cast in a single movement and has a performance duration of approximately ten minutes. The score contains musical quotations of such popular folk tunes as "Oh Shenandoah," "O du lieber Augustin", and "Turkey in the Straw." In the score program notes, the composer wrote:

In 1964, for the New York World's Fair I worked with John Houseman on a one-reel picture called Journey to America, to be shown four times an hour in the United States Pavilion. Telling the history of immigration almost entirely through prints and still photographs, it is humane, grandiose, and touching. The scoring uses old hymns, folklore, the music of our peoples, much of it nostalgically dissonant. And as always happens when I work with Houseman, we experimented, this time with the timing of commentary. By knowing exactly where it would appear and vanish, I was able to score first softer and then louder and thus to avoid dial-twiddling by engineers. Unfortunately, as also can happen with Houseman, his co-workers did not realize that my scoring was exact, for by slightly misplacing the music track in certain spots they threw some of my results just that much off. My method here, I still think was a good one; it should be of use in documentaries of which the text is poetry or compact prose. Applying it to jabber would not be worthwhile.

=== Instrumentation ===
The work is scored for a small orchestra consisting of a flute, oboe (doubling cor anglais), two clarinets (doubling bass clarinet), bassoon, four horns, two trumpets, percussion, and strings.

== Reception ==
Reviewing the world premiere, the music critic Robert Sherman of The New York Times wrote, "The piece seems rather unfocused—more like a loose collage of ideas than a purposefully organized fantasy—but its vintage musical points are skillfully made, and the effective orchestrations keep the interest level high."

However, at a 1986 Virgil Thomson retrospective commemorating the composer's 90th birthday, the music critic Bernard Holland was more favorable of the piece, remarking, "The modest ambitions of this music—its simplicity, its graceful assuredness, its disinterest in monumentality—bestow upon it a certain dignity if not a great size." He added, "Textures are clean, with a special love for unison passages but also for conflicting tonalities rubbing one against the other. After listening to such music, one has the urge to seek out the composer, shake his hand vigorously and thank him for his lack of pretension - this in a profession otherwise dedicated to the creation of deathless masterpieces. History will perhaps forget Pilgrims and Pioneers, but how appropriate it is to its own time and place."
