= Maurice Grosser =

American painter

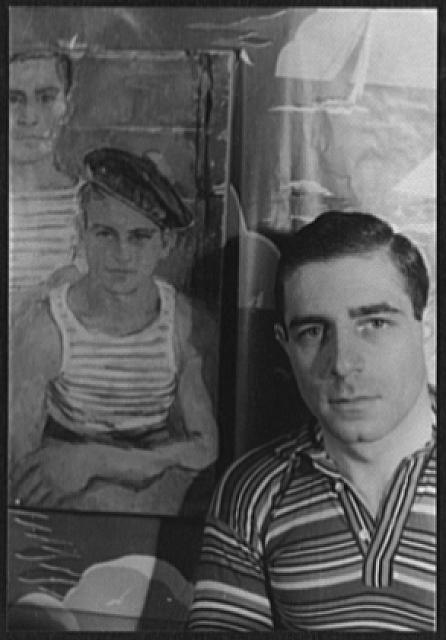
Portrait of Maurice Grosser by Carl Van Vechten, 1935

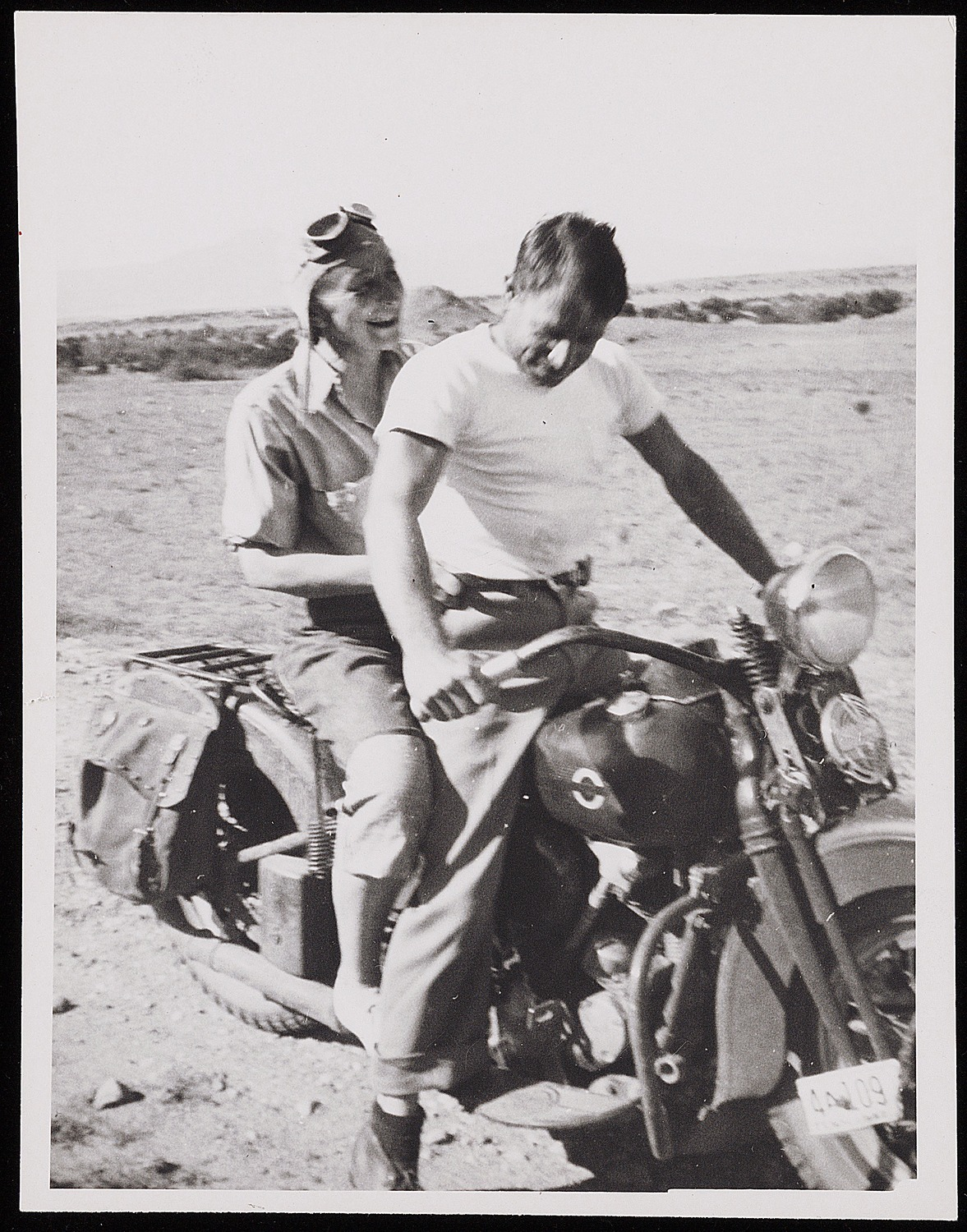
Maurice Grosser and Georgia O'Keeffe in Abiquiu, New Mexico, 1944

Maurice Grosser (October 23, 1903 – December 22, 1986) was an American painter, art critic, and writer.

== Biography ==
Maurice Grosser was born on October 23, 1903, in Huntsville, Alabama.

Grosser attended Harvard University where he studied mathematics, graduating with honors in 1924. While at university, a friend brought Grosser to a life painting class at the Boston Architectural School. From then on he continued life drawing there and at the South Boston Art School. While at Harvard, Grosser also took painting classes from Denman Ross. While still a student, Grosser's paintings were displayed at the Fogg Art Museum. Grosser was awarded Harvard's Sheldon Fellowship which allowed him to study painting in France.

He designed the scenario for two operas by Virgil Thomson: Four Saints in Three Acts (1934) and The Mother of Us All (1947). In 1985 he created 18 Portraits, and each lithograph was accompanied by a musical portrait composed by Thomson.

Grosser wrote four books on painting and art criticism: Painting in Public/Painting in Our Time (Alfred A. Knoff, 1948/Chater Books, 1964), The Painter's Eye (Rinehart and Co., 1951), Critic's Eye (The Bobbs-Merrill Company, Inc., 1962), and Painter's Progress (Clarkson N. Potter, Inc., 1971). At the time of his death, Grosser was writing a memoir entitled Visiting Gertrude Stein and Alice Toklas which was posthumously published in The Company They Kept: Writers on Unforgettable Friendships (New York Review Books, 2006).

From 1956 to 1967 he served as art critic for The Nation.

From 1969–1970 he was a Visiting Professor of Art at the University of Ife, Nigeria.

Grosser died on December 22, 1986, in Manhattan and his ashes are interred at Maple Hill Cemetery, Huntsville.

== Relationship with Virgil Thomson ==
Maurice and Virgil met in 1920 while both were attending meetings of The Liberal Club at Harvard but the intimate relationship between the two would not fully blossom until they met by chance in 1925 at Les Deux Magots, a café in Paris. The pair would continue their relationship as lovers and then as best friends for the rest of their lives.

== One-man exhibitions ==
- 1923 - Sever Hall Harvard University, Cambridge, MA
- 1925 - Grace Horne Gallery, Boston, MA
- 1931 - Galerie Vignon, Paris
- 1933 - Galerie des Quatre-Chemins, April 10 – 22, 1933, Paris
- 1935 - Hendryx Gallery, New York
- 1937 - Cadek Conservatory, Chattanooga, TN
- 1938 - Kunstzaal Benewitz, The Hague, The Netherlands
- 1938 - Galerie des Quatre-Chemins, April 10 – May 3, Paris
- 1939 - The Arts Club, Chicago, IL
- July 26 – October 18, 1940 - New Acquisitions: American Painting and Sculpture, The Museum of Modern Art, New York
- 1940,41 - Julien Levy Gallery, New York
- 1941 - High Museum, Atlanta, GA
- 1942 - Museum of Fine Arts, Houston, TX
- 1942 - Cadek Conservatory, Chattanooga, TN
- January 19 – March 26, 1944 - New Acquisitions: 12 American Paintings, The Museum of Modern Art, New York
- 1944,46 - Julien Levy Gallery, New York
- December 23, 1948 – March 13, 1949 - American Paintings from the Museum Collection, The Museum of Modern Art, New York
- 1948, 50 - Knoedler Gallery, New York
- 1951 - University of Chattanooga Art Gallery, Chattanooga, TN
- 1954 - Hugo Gallery, New York
- 1955 - Alexander Iolas Gallery, New York
- 1957 - Carstairs Gallery, New York - Recent Paintings, Greece and Brazil
- 1958 - Carlen Gallery, Philadelphia, PA
- 1960,62 - Carstairs Gallery, New York - Paintings of Morocco
- 1963,65,68 - Banfer Gallery, New York
- 1970 - Art Gallery, University of Ife, Nigeria
- 1971 - Hirschl & Adler Gallery, New York
- 1972,74 - Capricorn Gallery, Bethesda, MD
- 1974 - Boston Antheneum, Boston, MA
- 1974 - Larcada Gallery, New York
- 1976 - Huntsville Museum of Art, Huntsville, AL
- 1977 - Larcada Gallery, New York
- 1977 - Capricorn Gallery, Bethesda, MD
- 1979, 80, 82 - Fischbach Gallery, New York

== Legacy ==
- Paintings by Maurice Grosser are at the Museum of Modern Art, the Brooklyn Museum, the Smithsonian American Art Museum, Boston Museum of Fine Arts, and the Huntsville Museum of Art
- The Maurice Grosser papers, 1919–1983, are at the Archives of American Art, Smithsonian Institution.
- Maurice Grosser Estate in the Goldsmith-Schiffman Family Collection in the Special Collections and Archives at the University of Alabama Huntsville.
