= The Flood (Stravinsky) =

1962 musical stage production by Igor Stravinsky

- A musical play by Igor Stravinsky
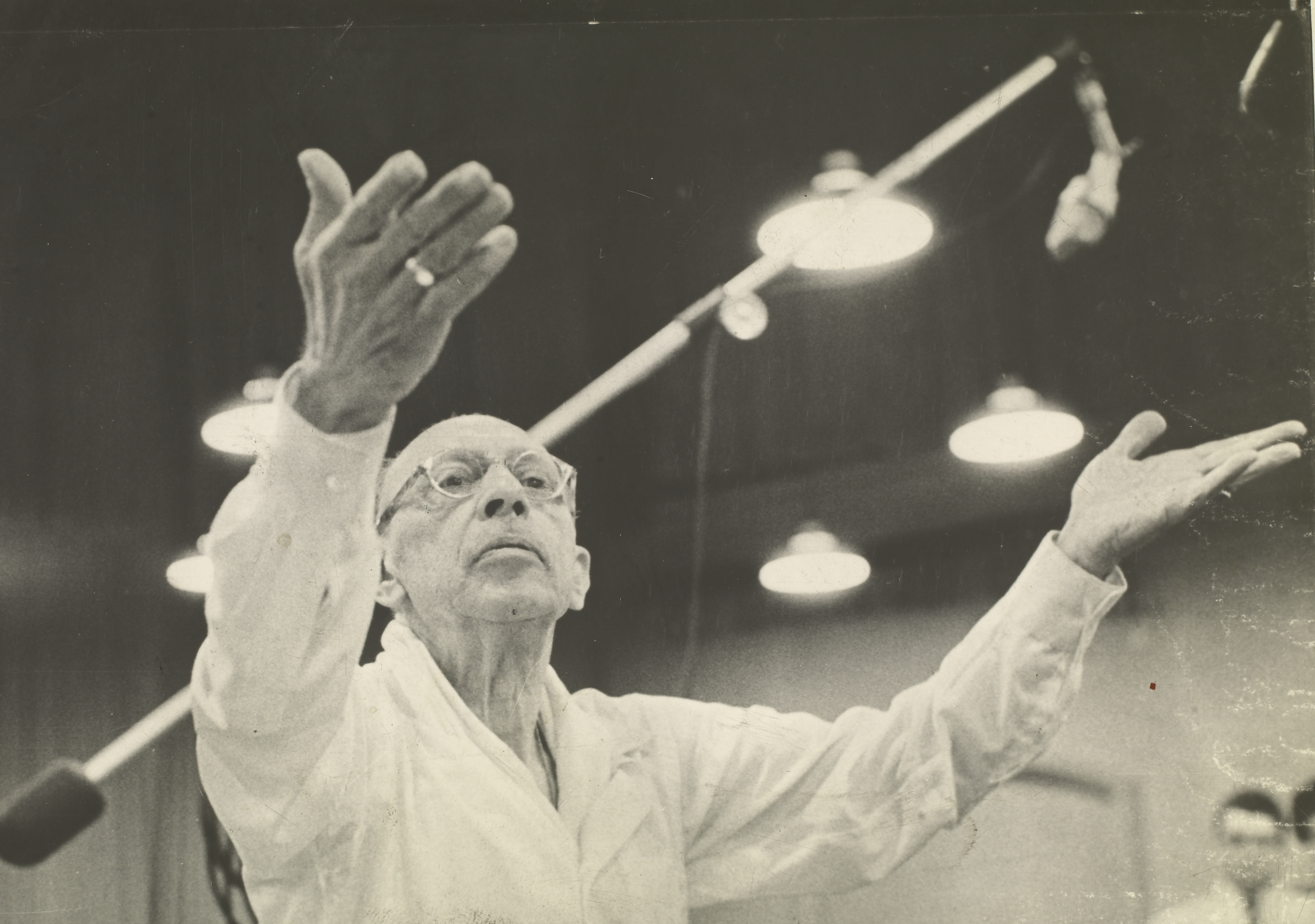
- Stravinsky in 1962
- Librettist: Robert Craft
- Language: English
- Based on: Noah and the Flood, mystery plays
- Premiere: 1962; CBS Columbia Square, Studio A

The Flood: A musical play (1962) is a short biblical drama by Igor Stravinsky on the story of Noah and the flood, originally conceived as a work for television. It contains singing, spoken dialogue, and ballet sequences. It is in Stravinsky's late, serial style.

The work was premiered in the United States on the CBS Television Network on 14 June 1962, a production conducted by Robert Craft and choreographed by George Balanchine. Dramatic actors participating in the work included Laurence Harvey (narrator), Sebastian Cabot (Noah), and Elsa Lanchester (Noah's wife, which Lanchester played with a Cockney accent). Robert Craft also conducted the first staged performance, by the Santa Fe Opera in New Mexico in 1962, and again in Hamburg on 30 April 1963.

== Text ==
The narrative of The Flood juxtaposes the story of the Creation with that of Noah. The text was compiled by Robert Craft using material from Genesis and the York and Chester cycles of mystery plays. Excerpts from the Te Deum are sung by the chorus.

== Scoring ==
The work is scored for tenor soloist (Lucifer/Satan), two bass soloists (God), several spoken parts (a narrator, Satan, Eve, Noah, a caller, Noah's wife, son of Noah), chorus (SAT) and a large orchestra of 3 flutes (3rd doubling piccolo), alto flute, 2 oboes, cor anglais, 2 clarinets, bass clarinet, contrabass clarinet, 2 bassoons, contrabassoon, 4 horns, 3 trumpets, 3 trombones (1st doubling alto trombone), tuba, percussion (timpani, bass drum, cymbals, xylorimba, and 3 tom-toms), harp, celesta, piano, and strings.

The Flood was published in 1963 by Boosey & Hawkes.

== Structure ==
The work is in seven parts:

1. Prelude
2. Melodrama
3. The building of the Ark (choreography)
4. The catalogue of the animals
5. The comedy (Noah and his wife)
6. The Flood (choreography)
7. The covenant of the rainbow

== Recordings ==
- The original cast recording, with Robert Craft conducting (in the composer's presence) the Columbia Symphony Orchestra and Chorus, recorded in 1962 for Columbia Masterworks Records, released on CD by Sony Classical Records (SM2K 46300)
- Oliver Knussen conducting the London Sinfonietta on Deutsche Grammophon (DG 447 068–2, released 1995)
