= Virgil Thomson =

American composer and critic (1896–1989)

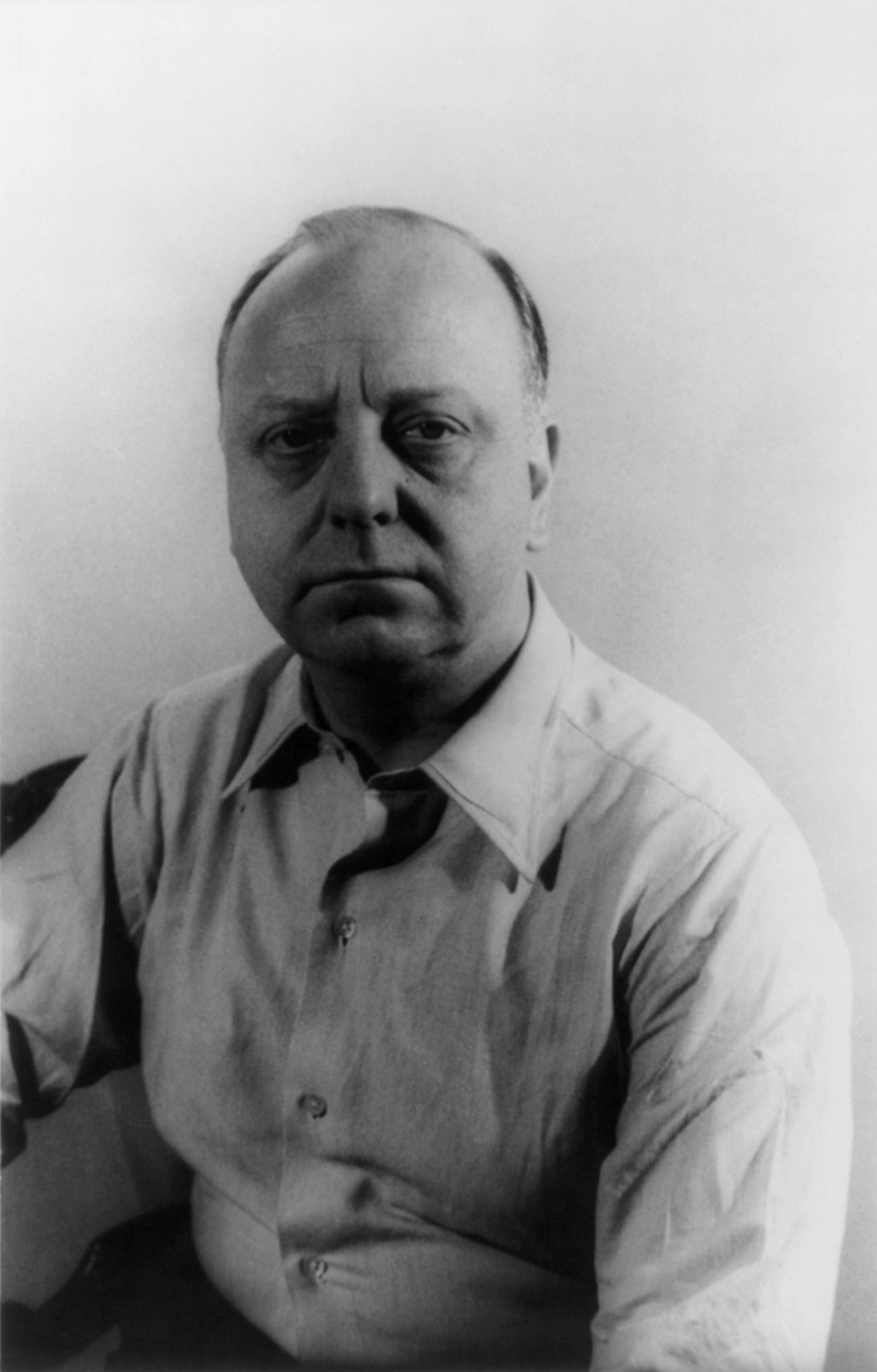
- Thomson in 1947, photographed by Carl Van Vechten
- Born: November 25, 1896; Kansas City, Missouri, U.S.
- Died: September 30, 1989 (aged 92); New York City, U.S.
- Occupations: Composer, critic
- Years active: 1920–1989
- Partner: Maurice Grosser
- Awards: National Medal of Arts; Kennedy Center Honors; Pulitzer Prize for Music

External audio
- Performance of Virgil Thomson's The Plow That Broke the Plains – Suite, Leopold Stokowski conducting the Hollywood Bowl Orchestra in 1946

Virgil Garnett Thomson (November 25, 1896 – September 30, 1989) was an American composer and critic. He was instrumental in the development of the "American Sound" in classical music. He has been described as a modernist, a neoromantic, a neoclassicist, and a composer of "an Olympian blend of humanity and detachment" whose "expressive voice was always carefully muted" until his late opera Lord Byron which, in contrast to all his previous work, exhibited an emotional content that rises to "moments of real passion".

== Biography ==
=== Early years ===
Thomson was born in Kansas City, Missouri. As a child he befriended Alice Smith, great-granddaughter of Joseph Smith, founder of the Latter-day Saint movement. During his youth he often played the organ in Grace Church (now Grace and Holy Trinity Cathedral), as his piano teacher was the church's organist. After World War I, he entered Harvard University thanks to a loan from Dr. Fred M. Smith, the president of the Reorganized Church of Jesus Christ of Latter Day Saints, and father of Alice Smith. His tours of Europe with the Harvard Glee Club helped nurture his desire to return there.

At Harvard, Thomson focused his studies on the piano work of Erik Satie. He studied in Paris on fellowship for a year, and after graduating lived in Paris from 1925 until 1940. While studying in Paris he was influenced by several French composers who were members of "Les Six" including: Darius Milhaud, Francis Poulenc, Arthur Honegger, Georges Auric, and Germaine Tailleferre. He eventually studied with Nadia Boulanger and became a fixture of "Paris in the twenties".

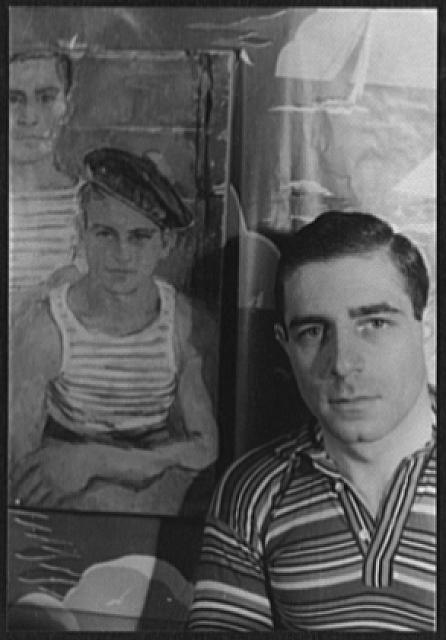
Maurice Grosser in 1935

In Paris in 1925, he cemented a relationship with painter Maurice Grosser, who was to become his life partner and frequent collaborator. Later he and Grosser lived at the Hotel Chelsea, where he presided over a largely gay salon that attracted many of the leading figures in music and art and theater, including Leonard Bernstein, Tennessee Williams, and many others. He also encouraged many younger composers and literary figures such as Theodor Adorno, Ned Rorem, Lou Harrison, John Cage, Frank O'Hara, and Paul Bowles. Grosser died in 1986, three years before Thomson.

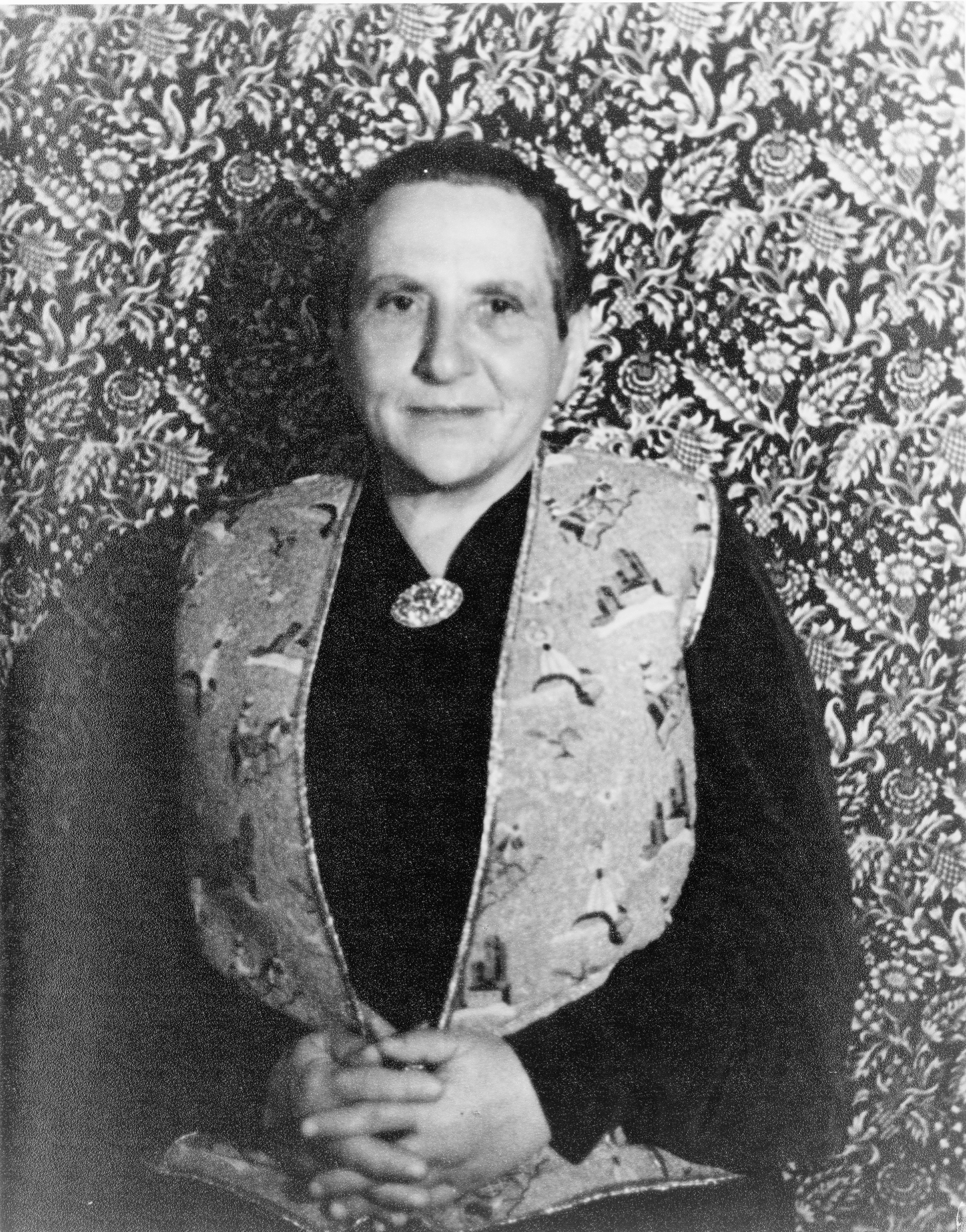
Gertrude Stein in 1934, photographed by Carl Van Vechten

His most important friend from this period was Gertrude Stein, who was an artistic collaborator and mentor to him. After meeting Stein in Paris in 1926, Thomson invited her to prepare a libretto for an opera which he hoped to compose. Their collaboration resulted in the premier of the groundbreaking composition Four Saints in Three Acts in 1934. At the time, the opera was noted for its form, musical content and the portrayal of European saints by an all-black cast. Years later in 1947, he collaborated once again with Stein on his provocative opera The Mother of Us All which portrays the life of the social reformer Susan B. Anthony. Thomson incorporated musical elements from Baptist hymns, Gregorian chants and popular songs into both scores while demonstrating a restrained use of dissonance.

Thomson's contributions to music were not limited to the operatic stage, however. In 1936, he established a collaboration with the film director Pare Lorentz and composed music for the documentary film The Plow That Broke the Plains for the United States government's Resettlement Administration (RA). Thomson incorporated folk melodies and religious musical themes into the film score and subsequently composed an orchestral suite of the same name which was recorded by Leopold Stokowski and the Hollywood Bowl Symphony Orchestra in 1946 for RCA Victor (# 11-9522,11-9523). In 1938 he also formed a collaboration with Lorentz and the operatic singer Thomas Hardie Chalmers on the documentary film The River for the United States government's Farm Security Administration. Thomson composed an orchestra suite based on the score; when it was published, the musical journal Notes commented: "Delightful as background music, the piece is an awful bore when you try to give it your full attention".

Subsequently, in 1948 he collaborated with the director Robert J. Flaherty on the docufiction film Louisiana Story, for which he received the Pulitzer Prize for Music in 1949. At the time, the award was the only Pulitzer Prize in music granted for a musical composition written exclusively for film. Thomson's suite based on the score was premiered by Eugene Ormandy and the Philadelphia Orchestra in 1949 to widespread critical acclaim.

Following the publication of his book, The State of Music, Thomson established himself in New York City as a rival of Aaron Copland. Thomson's criticisms of Copland were phrased in terms that brought accusations of antisemitism, but Copland remained on good terms with him, and Thomson admitted his envy of Copland's greater success as a composer. Thomson was also a music critic for the New York Herald Tribune from 1940 to 1954. A fellow critic, Robert Miles, accused him of being "vindictive and of settling scores in print". In a 1997 article in American Music, Suzanne Robinson writes that Thomson, motivated by "a mixture of spite, national pride, and professional jealousy" was consistently "severe and spiteful" to Benjamin Britten. Miles records that Thomson agitated for more performances in New York of new music, including his own.

Thomson's definition of music was "that which musicians do", and his views on music are radical in their insistence on reducing the rarefied aesthetics of music to market activity. He even went so far as to claim that the style a piece was written in could be most effectively understood as a consequence of its income source.

=== Later years ===
In 1969, Thomson composed Metropolitan Museum Fanfare: Portrait Of An American Artist to accompany the Museum's Centennial exhibition "New York Painting And Sculpture: 1940–1970".

Thomson became a sort of mentor and father figure to a new generation of American tonal composers such as Ned Rorem, Paul Bowles and Leonard Bernstein, a circle united as much by their shared homosexuality as by their similar compositional sensibilities. Women composers were not part of that circle, and one writer has suggested that, as a critic, he selectively omitted mention of their works, or adopted a more passive tone when praising them.

=== Awards and honors ===
Thomson was a recipient of Yale University's Sanford Medal. In 1949, he was awarded the Pulitzer Prize for Music for the score to the film Louisiana Story and in 1977, he was awarded The Edward MacDowell Medal by The MacDowell Colony for outstanding contributions to American culture. In addition, the Kennedy Center Honors award was bestowed upon Thomson in 1983. In 1988, he was awarded the National Medal of Arts by President Ronald Reagan. He was a National Patron of Delta Omicron, an international professional music fraternity.

=== Death ===
Thomson died on September 30, 1989, in his suite at the Hotel Chelsea in Manhattan, aged 92. He had lived at the Chelsea for close to 50 years. He is buried at Rehoboth Cemetery in Slater, Missouri, where his family was from.

== Works ==
Thomson's compositions are:

=== Operas ===
- Four Saints in Three Acts, libretto by Gertrude Stein (1928)
- The Mother of Us All, libretto by Gertrude Stein, 1947
- Lord Byron, libretto by Jack Larson (1966–1968)

=== Ballet ===
- Filling Station choreography by Lew Christensen (1937)
- Bayou choreography by George Balanchine (1952); music from Acadian Songs and Dances from the film Louisiana Story
- The Harvest According choreography by Agnes de Mille (1952); music from Symphony on a Hymn Tune, Concerto for Cello, and Suite from The Mother of Us All
- Hurray! (originally entitled Fourth of July, 1900) choreography by Erick Hawkins (1975) music: Symphony No. 2
- Parson Weems and the Cherry Tree choreography by Erick Hawkins (1975)

=== Film scores ===
- The Plow That Broke the Plains, film by Pare Lorentz (1936) Produced by the Works Progress Administration—Farm Security Administration
- The River, film by Pare Lorentz (1937) Produced by the Works Progress Administration—Farm Security Administration
- The Spanish Earth, film by Joris Ivens and Ernest Hemingway (1937) A montage of recorded Spanish folk music made in collaboration with Marc Blitzstein
- Tuesday in November, a U.S. Office of War Information film by John Berry (1945)
- Louisiana Story, film by Robert Flaherty (1948)
- The Goddess La Deesse, film written by Paddy Chayevsky, directed by John Cromwell (1957)
- Power Among Men, produced by the United Nations film unit (1958)
- Journey to America, a film for the U.S. Pavilion at the New York World's Fair, produced and directed by John Houseman (1964)
- The Baby Maker, film by James Bridges (1970)
- Suddenly an Eagle, ABC News film (1975)

=== Incidental music ===
- Le Droit de Varech (manuscript, 1930) accordion solo
- A Bride for the Unicorn (manuscript, 1934) male chorus, 3 perc.
- Macbeth (manuscript, 1936) chamber orchestra. (Shakespeare; for Orson Welles, WPA Federal Theatre Project)
- Injunction Granted (manuscript, 1936) 4-person chamber group with 16 percussionists
- Horse Eats Hat (Un Chapeau de paille d'Italie) (manuscript, 1936) chamber orch. (for WPA Federal Theatre Project)
- Hamlet (manuscript, 1936) 9 players (Shakespeare; for John Houseman, WPA Federal Theatre Project)
- Antony and Cleopatra (manuscript, 1937) oboe, 2 trumpets, 2 perc (Shakespeare play)
- Androcles and the Lion (manuscript, 1938) not orchestrated (George Bernard Shaw play at WPA Federal Theatre Project)
- The Trojan Women (manuscript, 1940) 6 players (play by Euripides; for John Houseman, CBS Workshop)
- The Life of a Careful Man (manuscript, 1941) chamber orchestra & women's voices (soundtrack for CBS Workshop)
- Oedipus Tyrannos (manuscript, 1941) flute, 2 horns, perc, male chorus (play by Sophocles at Fordham Univ.)
- King Lear (manuscript, 1952) 10 players (Shakespeare, for TV-Radio Workshop of the Ford Foundation)
- The Grass Harp (Boosey & Hawkes, 1952) flute, harp, celeste, vln, vla, cello (Truman Capote play)
- Ondine (Boosey & Hawkes, 1954) 8 players
- King John (manuscript, 1956) 2 horns, 2 trpts, 2 perc (Shakespeare; for John Houseman at the American Shakespeare Festival Theatre in CT)
- Measure for Measure (manuscript, 1956) 7 players & boy soprano (Shakespeare; for Houseman and ASFT in CT)
- Othello (manuscript, 1957) 8 players (Shakespeare; for Houseman and ASFT in CT)
- The Merchant of Venice (manuscript, 1957) 8 players and tenor solo (for AFST in CT)
- Much Ado About Nothing (manuscript, 1957) 9 players and tenor solo (Shakespeare; for Houseman and ASFT in CT)
- Bertha (manuscript, 1959) trumpet solo (for Living Theatre/Cherry Lane Theatre)

=== Orchestra ===
- Two Sentimental Tangos (manuscript, 1923); orchestrated from the original piano version
- Symphony on a Hymn Tune (Southern, 1928)
- Suite from The Plow That Broke the Plains (G. Schirmer, 1936)
- Suite from The River (Southern, 1937)
- Suite from Filling Station (Boosey & Hawkes, 1937)
- The John Mosher Waltzes (Boosey & Hawkes, 1937); orchestrated from the piano portrait of John Mosher (excerpted from ballet Filling Station)
- Symphony No. 2 in C major (Leeds/Belwin Mills, 1931, rev. 1941)
- Eight Portraits for orchestra (1942-1944) (grouping by G. Schirmer)
1. Bugles and Birds (G. Schirmer, 1944) from piano portrait of Pablo Picasso
2. Canons for Dorothy Thompson Portrait for Orchestra (G. Schirmer, 1942)
3. Fugue (G. Schirmer, 1944) from piano portrait of Alexander Smallens
4. The Mayor LaGuardia Waltzes Portrait for Orchestra (G. Schirmer, 1942)
5. Cantabile for Strings (G. Schirmer, 1944) from the piano portrait of Nicholas de Chatelain
6. Pastorale (G. Schirmer, 1944) from piano portrait of Aaron Copland (later used in the film Tuesday in November)
7. Percussion Piece (G. Schirmer, 1944) from piano portrait of Jessie K. Lasell
8. Tango Lullaby (G. Schirmer, 1944) from piano portrait of Flavie Alvarez de Toledo
- Meditation (G. Schirmer, 1944) orchestrated from piano portrait of Jere Abbott
- Fugue and Chorale on Yankee Doodle (G. Schirmer, 1945) from the film Tuesday in November
- Three Pictures for Orchestra (1947–1952)
1. The Seine at Night (G. Schirmer, 1947)
2. Wheat Field at Noon (G. Schirmer, 1948)
3. Sea Piece with Birds (G. Schirmer, 1952)
- Suite from Louisiana Story (G. Schirmer, 1948) Pulitzer Prize 1949
- Acadian Songs and Dances from Louisiana Story (G. Schirmer, 1948)
- At the Beach: Concert Waltz for Trumpet and Band (Carl Fischer, 1949)
- Solemn Music for band (G. Schirmer, 1949) later also for orchestra (written after the death of Gertrude Stein)
- Suite from The Mother of Us All (G. Schirmer, 1949)
- Concerto for Cello and Orchestra (Ricordi/Belwin Mills, 1950)
- Concerto for Flute, Strings, harp and Percussion: A Portrait of Roger Baker (1954) [also arranged for flute and piano]
- Eleven Chorale Preludes op. 122, by Johannes Brahms, orchestrated by Virgil Thomson (Boosey & Hawkes, 1956)
- The Lively Arts Fugue (manuscript, 1957)
- Fugues and Cantilenas (Boosey & Hawkes, 1959) from the United Nations film Power Among Men
- Solemn Music and a Joyful Fugue (G. Schirmer, 1962) [Solemn Music originally for band] (Joyful Fugue later also arranged for band)
- Pilgrims and Pioneers (G. Schirmer, 1964) from the film Journey to America
- Autumn: Concertino for Harp, Strings and Percussion (G. Schirmer, 1964)
- Fantasy in Homage to an Earlier England (Boosey & Hawkes, 1966)
- Edges: A Portrait of Robert Indiana (G. Schirmer, 1969) for band, orchestrated from piano original
- Study Piece: Portrait of a Lady (G. Schirmer, 1969) for band, orchestrated from piano portrait of Louise Crane
- Symphony No. 3 (Boosey & Hawkes, 1972) orchestration of String Quartet No. 2
- Thoughts for Strings (Boosey & Hawkes, 1981)
- Eleven Portraits for Orchestra (1981–1982) 11 piano portraits orchestrated by Thomson, Scott Wheeler and Rodney Lister
1. A Love Scene (orch. Thomson) (Dead Pan: Mrs. Betty Freeman)
2. Intensely Two: Karen Brown Waltuck (orch. Thomson)
3. Loyal, Steady Persistent: Noah Creshevsky (orch. Thomson)
4. Something of a Beauty: Anne-Marie Soullière (orch. Thomson)
5. David Dubal in Flight (orch. Thomson)
6. Scott Wheeler: Free-Wheeling (orch. Wheeler)
7. Dennis Russel Davies: In a Hammock (orch. Wheeler)
8. Richard Flender: Solid, Not Stolid (orch. Wheeler)
9. Bill Katz: Wide Awake (orch. Lister)
10. Sam Byers: With Joy (orch. Lister)
11. Christopher Cox: Singing a Song (orch. Lister)
- Four Saints: An Olio for Chamber Orchestra (G. Schirmer, 1984)
- A Pair of Portraits: A Double Take and Major Chords (manuscript, 1984) orchestrated from piano portraits of John Houseman and Anthony Tommasini

=== Vocal ===
- Vernal Equinox (manuscript, 1920) voice, piano; text by Amy Lowell
- The Sunflower (manuscript, 1920) voice, piano; text by William Blake
- Susie Asado (Boosey & Hawkes, 1926) voice, piano; text by Gertrude Stein
- Five Phrases from "The Song of Solomon" (American Music Edition/Presser, 1926) for soprano and percussion; biblical text
1. Thou That Dwellest in the Gardens
2. Return, O Shulamite
3. O, My Dove
4. I am My Beloved's
5. By Night
- The Tiger (G. Schirmer, 1926) voice, piano; text by William Blake
- Presciosilla (G. Schirmer, 1927) voice, piano; text by Gertrude Stein
- La Valse Grégorienne (Southern, 1927, rev. 1971) medium voice, piano; text by Georges Hugnet (English translation as Gregorian Waltz by Donald Sutherland)
1. Les Ecrevisses (Crayfish)
2. Grenadine (Pomegranate)
3. La Rosée (Dew)
4. Le Wagon Immobile (The Motionless Box-Car)
- Le Berceau de Gertrude Stein, ou Le Mystere de la Rue de Fleurus (Southern, 1928) voice, piano; eight poems by Georges Hugnet (English translation as The Cradle of Gertrude Stein or Mysteries in the rue de Fleurus by Donald Sutherland) [Music by Thomson entitled Lady Godiva's Waltzes]
- Trois Poemes de la Duchesse de Rohan (individually published, 1928) voice, piano
1. A son Altesse le Princesse Antoinette Murat (To Her Highness Princess Antoinette Murat) (manuscript)
2. Jour de chaleur aux bains de mer (Hot Day at the Seashore) (Boosey & Hawkes; English translation by Sherry Mangan
3. La Seine (printed in Parnassus: Poetry in Review 5, 1977)
- Commentaire sur Saint Jérome (Southern, 1928) voice, piano (text by Marquis de Sade; English translation as Commentary on Saint Jerome by Donald Sutherland)
- Les Soirées Bagnolaises (manuscript, 1928) voice, piano (text by Georges Hugnet)
- Portrait of F. B. (Frances Blood) (G. Schirmer, 1929) voice, piano (text by Gertrude Stein)
- Le Singe et le léopard (Southern, 1930) voice, piano (text by Jean de La Fontaine; English translation as The Monkey and the Leopard by Donald Sutherland)
- Oraison Funèbre de Henriette-Marie de France, Reine de la Grande-Bretagne (manuscript, 1930, rev. 1934) voice, piano (text by Jacques Bossuet; translated as Funeral Oration of Henriette-Marie of France, Queen of Great Britain by Donald Sutherland)
- Air de Phèdre (Southern, 1930) voice, piano (text by Jean Racine; translated as Phaedra's Farewell by Donald Sutherland)
- Deux Soeurs qui ne sont pas soeurs (Southern, 1930) voice, piano (text by Gertrude Stein; English translation as Two Sisters Not Sisters) (piano accompaniment is a portrait of Stein's dog, Basket I)
- Stabat Mater (Boosey & Hawkes, 1931, rev. 1981); arranged for voice and string orchestra from the original for voice and string quartet (or piano)
- Chamber Music (manuscript, 1931) voice, piano (text by Alfred Kreymbord)
- La Belle en dormant (G. Schirmer, 1931) voice, piano (text by Georges Hugnet; English translation as Beauty Sleeping by Elaine de Sirçay)
1. Pour chercher sur la carte des mers (Scanning Booklets from Ocean Resorts)
2. La Première de toutes (My True Love Sang me No Song)
3. Mon Amour es bon à dire (Yes My Love is Good to Tell Of)
4. Partis les vaisseaux (All Gone Are the Ships)
- Pigeons on the Grass Alas (G. Schirmer, 1934) baritone, piano (from the opera Four Saints in Three Acts, text by Gertrude Stein)
- Go to Sleep, Alexander Smallens, Jr. (manuscript, 1935) voice unaccompanied
- Go to Sleep, Pare McTaggett Lorentz (manuscript, 1937) voice unaccompanied
- Dirge (G. Schirmer, 1939) voice, piano (text by John Webster)
- The Bugle Song (manuscript, 1941) mz-sop or baritone and piano (text by Alfred Lord Tennyson; published for unison children's chorus; additional manuscript for 2-part children's chorus)
- Five Songs from William Blake (Southern, 1951) baritone and orchestra; orchestrated from the original for baritone and piano (text by William Blake; commissioned by the Louisville Philharmonic)
1. The Divine Image
2. Tiger! Tiger!
3. The Land of Dreams
4. The Little Black Boy
5. And Did Those Feet
- Consider, Lord (Southern, 1955) voice, piano (text by John Dunne)
- Remember Adam's Fall (Gray/Belwin Mills, 1955) voice, piano (anonymous text)
- At the Spring (Gray/Belwin Mills, 1955) Voice, piano (text by Jasper Fisher)
- The Bell Doth Toll (Southern, 1955) voice, piano (text by Thomas Heywood)
- Look How the Floor of Heaven (Gray/Belwin Mills, 1955) voice, piano (text by William Shakespeare)
- If Thou A Reason Dost Desire to Know (Southern, 1958) voice, piano (text by Sir Francis Kynaston)
- John Peel (Southern, 1955) voice, piano (text by John Woodcock Graves)
- Shakespeare Songs (Southern, 1957) voice, piano (text by William Shakespeare; 4 songs are from incidental music Thomson wrote for Shakespeare stage plays)
1. Was This Fair Face the Cause? (from All's Well That Ends Well)
2. Take, O Take Those Lips Away (from Measure for Measure)
3. Tell Me Where is Fancy Bred (from Merchant of Venice)
4. Pardon, Goddess of the Night (from Much Ado About Nothing)
5. Sigh No More, Ladies (from Much Ado About Nothing)
- Tres Estmpas de Ninez (Southern, 1957) voice, piano (text by Reyna Rivas; English translation as Three Sketches from Childhood by Sherry Mangan)
1. Todas las horas (All Through the Long Day)
2. Son amigos de todos (They Are Everyone's Friends)
3. Nadie lo oye como ellos (No One Can Hear Him The Way They Can)
- Mostly About Love (G. Schirmer, 1959; published separately) voice, piano (text by Kenneth Koch; orig. title: Songs for Alice Esty)
1. Love Song
2. Down at the Docks
3. Let's Take a Walk
4. A Prayer to St. Catherine
- Collected Poems (Southern, 1959) soprano, baritone and orch. (or piano)
- Mass for Solo Voice (G. Schirmer, 1962); Voice (or unison choir) and orchestra (or piano)
- Praises and Prayers (G. Schirmer, 1963; published separately) voice and piano
1. from The Canticle of the Sun (text by St. Francis of Assisi)
2. My Master Hath a Garden (anonymous; also versions for SATB or SSA chorus)
3. Sung by the Shepherd's (Hymn to the Nativity by Richard Crashaw)
4. Before Sleeping (anonymous)
5. Jerusalem, My Happy Home (from The Meditation of St. Augustine)
- Two by Marianne Moore (G. Schirmer, 1963; published separately)
1. English Usage
2. My Crow Pluto
- The Feast of Love according to the poem Pervigilium Veneris for baritone and chamber orchestra (or piano) (G. Schirmer, 1964)
- From Byron's "Don Juan" (Southern, 1967) for tenor and orchestra
- from Sneden's Landing Variations (Lingus Press, 1972) voice, piano (text by Frank O'Hara)
- The Courtship of Yongly Bongly Bo (G. Schirmer, 1974) voice, piano (text by Edward Lear; orig. part of Lear Cantata)
- Go to Sleep, Gabriel Liebowitz (manuscript, 1979) voice unaccompanied
- What Is It? (Presser, 1979) voice, piano (or guitar) (text by Thomas Campion)
- The Cat (G. Schirmer, 1980) soprano and baritone & piano (text by Jack Larson)

=== Choral ===
- De Profundis (Weinitraub, 1920/revised 1951) for mixed chorus
- O My Deir Hert (Heritage, 1921/rev. 1978) for mixed chorus; text by Martin Luther
- Sanctus (manuscript, 1921) for men's chorus
- Tribulationes Civitatum (Weintraub, 1922) for mixed (or men's) chorus
- Three Antiphonal Psalms (G. Schirmer, 1924) for SA or TB chorus (Psalms 123, 133 & 136)
- Agnus Dei (Presser, 1924) for 3 equal voices
- Missa Brevis (manuscript, 1924) for men's chorus
- Fête Polonaise (manuscript 1924) arranged from Chabrier for men's chorus & piano
- Benedictus (manuscript, 1926)
- Sanctus (manuscript, 1926)
- Capital Capitals (Boosey & Hawkes, 1927) for TTBB (or 4 male voices) & piano (text by Gertrude Stein)
- Saints' Procession (G. Schirmer, 1928) for mixed chorus, mz-s, bass solos & piano (text by Gertrude Stein from Four Saints in Three Acts)
- Seven Choruses from the "Medea" of Euripides (G. Schirmer, 1934; text translated by Countee Cullen) for women's chorus & percussion (also arranged for mixed chorus by Daniel Pinkham)
1. O gentle heart
2. Love, like a leaf
3. O, happy were our fathers
4. Weep for the little lambs
5. Go down, O Sun
6. Behold, O Earth
7. Immortal Zeus controls the fate of Man
- Mass for Two-Part Chorus and Percussion (MCA/Belwins Mills, 1934)
- My Shepherd Will Supply My Need (Gray/Belwin Mills, 1937; text is Isaac Watt's paraphrase of Psalm 23) (also versions for men's or women's chorus, or for voice and piano or organ)
- Scenes from the Holy Infancy According to Saint Matthew (G. Schirmer, 1937) for mixed chorus and men's solos
- The Bugle Song (Holt, Rinehart and Winston, 1941; text by Alfred Lord Tennyson) for unison children's chorus (or solo voice) and piano
- Surrey Apple-Howler's Song (Holt, Rinehart and Winston, 1941) children's chorus
- Welcome to the New Year (Holt, Rinehart and Winston, 1941; text by Elanor Farjeon) for children's (or mixed) chorus
- Hymns from the Old South (Gray/Belwin Mills, 1949) for mixed chorus (published separately)
1. Death, 'Tis a Melancholy Day (Isaac Watts)
2. Green Fields (John Newton)
3. The Morning Star (Anonymous)
- Kyrie Eleison (Gray/Belwins Mills, 1953) [later part of the Missa pro defunctis]
- Never Another (Columbia, 1955; text by Mark Van Doren)
- Song for the Stable (Columbia, 1955; text by Amanda Benjamin Hall) for mixed chorus
- Four Songs to Poems of Thomas Campion (Southern, 1955) mixed chorus (or solo voice), viola, clarinet and harp (or just piano)
- Tiger! Tiger! (Southern, 1955; text by William Blake) SATB (or TTBB) chorus and piano (orig. for solo voice from Campion cycle)
- Crossing Brooklyn Ferry to poems by Walt Whitman (Boosey & Hawkes, 1961); mixed chorus and orchestra
- Missa pro defunctis (Gray/Belwin Mills, 1960) for mixed chorus and orchestra
- Dance in Praise (Boosey & Hawkes, 1962; text by John Symonds); mixed chorus and orchestra
- The Holly and the Ivy (G. Schirmer, 1963) SATB chorus (or solo voice) & piano
- My Master Hath a Garden (G. Schirmer, 1963) for SATB (or SSAA) chorus & piano
- Five Auvergnat Folk Songs (Presser, 1964) mixed chorus versions of 5 Joseph Canteloube songs (with original piano or orch accomp)
1. La Pastoura als camps (La Bergère aux champs)
2. Bailèro (Chant de bergers de Haute-Auvergne)
3. Pastourelle
4. La Fiolairé (La Fileuse) (Anonymous)
5. Passo pel prat (Viens par le pré)
- When I Survey the Bright Celestial Sphere (Peters, 1964; text by William Habbingdon)
- The Nativity As Sung By the Shepherds (G. Schirmer, 1967; Richard Crashaw) for mixed chorus, soloists & orch.
- How Will Ye Have Your Partridge Today? (manuscript, 1967; text by Nicholas Brown) Round for 3 voices
- A Hymn for Pratt Institute (manuscript, 1968; text by Rolf Fjelde) for mixed chorus
- Cantata on Poems of Edward Lear (G. Schirmer, 1974) for chorus, soloists & orch. (or piano)
1. The Owl and the Pussycat for soprano and baritone
2. The Jumblies (Anonymous) for soprano and chorus
3. The Pelican Chorus for soprano, baritone and chorus
4. Half an Alphabet for chorus
5. The Akond of Swat for baritone and chorus
- The Peace Place (Heritage, 1979; text by Jack Larson) for mixed chorus and piano [revised as Fanfare for Peace]
- A Prayer to Venus (G. Schirmer, 1981; text by John Fletcher) for mixed chorus and piano
- Cantantes Eamus (G. Schirmer, 1982; text by Virgil) for men's chorus and piano
- Fanfare for Peace (Southern, 1983; text by Jack Larson) for chorus, brass & perc (or piano) [revision of Peace Place]
- Southern Hymns (Southern, 1984) for mixed chorus and piano
1. "How Bright is the Day!" (Rev. S.B. Sawyer)
2. Mississippi "When Gabriel's Awful Trumpet Shall Sound" (from Kentucky Harmony)
3. Death of General Washington (Stephen Jenks)
4. Convention "How Firm a Foundation" for chorus from Caldwell's Union Harmony)

=== Keyboard ===
- Prelude (McAfee Music, 1921) piano (also version for organ by Calvin Hampton)
- Pastorale on a Christmas Plainsong (Gray/Belwin Mills, 1922) organ
  1. Divinium Mysterium
  2. God Rest Ye Merry
  3. Picardy
- Fanfare (Gray/Belwin Mills, 1922) organ
- Prelude (G. Schirmer, 1922) organ
- Passacaglia (G. Schirmer, 1922, rev. 1974) organ
- Two Sentimental Tangos (manuscript, 1923) piano (originally Three Sentimental Tangos; also orchestrated)
- Five Chorale-Preludes (G. Schirmer, 1924) organ
  1. O, Sacred Head Now Wounded!
  2. The New-Born Babe (1st version)
  3. The New-Born Babe (2nd version)
  4. The New-Born Babe (3rd version)
  5. Praise God, Ye Christians Ev'rywhere
- Synthetic Waltzes (Presser, 1925) 2 pianos (or 1 piano, 4 hands)
- Five Two-Part Inventions (Presser, 1926) piano (4 of these arranged for guitar by David Leisner)
- Ten Easy Pieces and a Coda (Southern, 1926) piano
- Variations on Sunday School Tunes (Gray/Belwin Mills, 1927) organ (orig. published separately; now collected as Variations on Four Sunday School Themes)
  1. Come, Ye Disconsolate
  2. There's Not a Friend Like the Lowly Jesus
  3. Will There Be Any Stars in My Crown?
  4. Shall We Gather At the River?
- Piano Sonata No. 1 (MCA/Belwin Mills, 1929) [later scored for orchestra as Symphony No. 2]
- Piano Sonata No. 2 (MCA/Belwin Mills, 1929) [later score for harp and orchestra as Autumn: Concertino for Harp, Strings and Percussion)
- Piano Sonata No. 3 "on white keys" (Southern, 1930) (for Gertrude Stein)
- Symphony No. 2 (Leeds/Belwin Mills, 1932) reduced from orchestra for piano, 4 hands
- Suite from "The Plow That Broke the Plains" (G. Schirmer, 1936) reduced for orchestra for piano
- Filling Station (Boosey & Hawkes, 1937) piano version of ballet score
- Church Organ Wedding Music (Randall M. Eagen and Associates, 1940, rev. 1978)
- Piano Sonata No. 4: Guggenheim jeune (Portrait of Peggy Guggenheim) (Southern, 1940)
- Ten Etudes for Piano (Carl Fischer, 1944)
- Nine Etudes for Piano (G. Schirmer, 1940-1951)
- Walking Song (manuscript, 1951) for piano (from the movie Tuesday in November); also version for 2 pianos by Gold and Fizdale
- For a Happy Occasion (Peters, 1951) (Originally entitled Happy Birthday, Mrs. Zimbalist)
- A Study in Stacked-Up Thirds (Southern, 1958) [later a portrait of Eugene Ormandy]
- Pange Lingua (G. Schirmer, 1962) for organ
- Pastor Weems and the Cherry Tree (Boosey & Hawkes, 1975) piano version of the ballet
- Theme for Improvisation (manuscript, 1981) for organ

=== Piano portraits ===
(Thomson began writing portraits of friends and acquaintances who passed through his life beginning 1929 through 1985. Written in the subject's presence in one sitting, they're mostly for piano, usually under 3 minutes each. He orchestrated many and used several as part of larger works.)

- Travelling in Spain: Alice Woodfin Branlière (Boosey & Hakwes, 1929)
- Alternations: A Portrait of Maurice Grosser (G. Schirmer, 1929)
- Catalan Waltz: A Portrait of Ramón Senabre (G. Schirmer, 1929)
- Clair Leonard's profile (Boosey & Hawkes, 1930)
- Madame Dubost chez elle (Southern, 1930)
- Pastoral: A Portrait of Jean Ozenne (G. Schirmer, 1930)
- Russell Hitchcock, Reading (Southern, 1930)
- Sea Coast: A Portrait of Constance Askew (G. Schirmer, 1935)
- A Portrait of R. Kirk Askew (G. Schirmer, 1935)
- Souvenir: A Portrait of Paul Bowles (G. Schirmer, 1935)
- Ettie Stettheimer (Southern, 1935)
- An Old Song: A Portrait of Carrie Stettheimer (G. Schimer, 1935)
- Tennis: A Portrait of Henry McBride (G. Schirmer, 1935)
- The Hunt: A Portrait of A. Everett Austin, Jr. (G. Schirmer, 1935)
- Hymn: A Portrait of Josiah Marvel (G. Schirmer, 1935)
- The John Mosher Waltzes (Boosey & Hawkes, 1935) (used in ballet Filling Station)
- Prelude and Fugue: A Portrait of Miss Agnes Rindge (G. Schirmer, 1935)
- Helen Austin at Home and Abroad (Southern, 1935)
- Meditation: A Portrait of Jere Abbott (G.Schirmer, 1935) (later orchestrated)
- Connecticut Waltz: A Portrait of Harold Lewis Cook (Boosey & Hawkes, 1935)
- A Day Dream: Portrait of Herbert Whiting (Carl Fischer, 1935)
- Portrait of Claude Biais (manuscript, 1938)
- A French Boy of Ten: Louis Lange (Southern, 1938)
- Maurice Bavoux: Young and Alone (Boosey & Hawkes, 1938)
- The Bard: A Portrait of Sherry Mangan (G. Schirmer, 1940)
- In a Bird Cage: A Portrait of Lise Deharme (G. Schirmer, 1940)
- With Trumpet and Horn: A Portrait of Louise Ardant (G. Schirmer, 1940)
- Poltergeist: A Portrait of Hans Arp (G. Schirmer, 1940)
- Fanfare for France: A Portrait of Max Kahn (G. Schirmer, 1940) (later for brass and perc; also cello and piano)
- Barcarolle: A Portrait of Georges Hugnet (G. Schirmer, 1940) (later as Barcarolle for Woodwinds)
- Swiss Waltz: A Portrait of Sophie Tauber-Arp (G. Schirmer, 1940)
- Eccentric Dance: Portrait of Madame Kristians Tonny (Carl Fischer, 1940)
- Tango Lullaby: A Portrait of Mll. [Flavie] Alvarez de Toledo (G. Schirmer, 1940) (also part of Eight Portraits for orchestra)
- Invention: Theodate Johnson Busy and Resting (Boosey & Hawkes, 1940)
- Bugles and Birds: A Portrait of Pablo Picasso (G. Schirmer, 1940) (also part of Eight Portraits for orchestra)
- Piano Sonata No. 4: Portrait of Peggy Guggenheim (Southern, 1940)
- Lullaby Which is Also a Spinning Song: A Portrait of Howard Putzel (G. Schirmer, 1940)
- Five-Finger Exercise: A Portrait of Leon Kochnitzky (G. Schirmer, 1940)
- The Dream World of Peter Rose-Pulham (G. Schirmer, 1940)
- Dora Maar or the Presence of Pablo Picasso (Boosey & Hawkes, 1940)
- Pastoral: A Portrait of Tristan Tzara (Southern, 1940)
- Aria: A Portrait of Germaine Hugnet (G. Schirmer, 1940)
- Toccata: A Portrait of Mary Widney (G. Schirmer, 1940)
- Awake or Asleep: Pierre Mabille (Southern, 1940)
- Cantabile: A Portrait of Nicolas de Chatelain (G. Schirmer, 1940) (also part of Eight Portraits for orchestra)
- Duet: A Portrait of Clarita Comtesse de Forceville (Boosey & Hawkes, 1940)
- Stretching: A Portrait of Jamie Campbell (Boosey & Hawkes, 1940)
- Canons with Cadenza: A Portrait of André Ostier (G. Schirmer, 1940)
- Fugue: A Portrait of Alexander Smallens (G. Schirmer, 1940) (also part of Eight Portraits for orchestra)
- With Fife and Drums: A Portrait of Mina Curtiss (G. Schirmer, 1941)
- Insistences: A Portrait of Louise Crane (G. Schirmer, 1941)
- Percussion Piece: A Portrait of Jessie K. Lasell (manuscript, 1941) (also part of Eight Portraits for orchestra)
- Parades: A Portrait of Florine Stettheimer (Boosey & Hawkes, 1941) later for brass and percussion as Metropolitan Museum Fanfare)
- James Patrick Cannon, Professional Revolutionary (Boosey & Hawkes, 1942)
- Scottish Memories: Peter Monro Jack (Boosey & Hawkes, 1942)
- Prisoner of the Mind: Schuyler Watts (Southern, 1942)
- Wedding Music: A Portrait of Jean [Mrs. Schuyler] Watts (G. Schirmer, 1942)
- Aaron Copland, Persistently Pastoral (Boosey & Hawkes, 1942) (also part of Eight Portraits for orchestra as Pastorale)
- Five-Finger Exercise: Portrait of Briggs Buchanan (Carl Fischer, 1943)
- Solitude: A Portrait of Lou Harrison (G. Schirmer, 1945)
- Chromatic Double Harmonies: Portrait of Sylvia Marlowe (G. Schirmer, 1951) [part of Nine Etudes)
- Homage to Marya Freund and to the Harp (Boosey & Hawkes, 1956)
- Edges: A Portrait of Robert Indiana (G. Schirmer, 1966) (later for band)
- For Eugene Ormandy's Birthday, 18 November 1969: A Study in Stacked-Up Thirds (Southern, 1969)
- Man of Iron: A Portrait of Willy Eisenhart (G. Schirmer, 1972) (later the last movement in the brass quintet Family Portrait)
- Bill Katz: Wide Awake (Boosey & Hawkes, 1981)
- Norma Flender: Thoughts about Flying (Boosey & Hawkes, 1981)
- Richard Flender: Solid Not Stolid (Boosey & Hawkes, 1981) (also part of Eleven Portraits for Orchestra, 1982)
- Scott Wheeler: Free-Wheeling (Boosey & Hawkes, 1981) (also part of Eleven Portraits for Orchestra)
- Gerald Busby: Giving Full Attention (Boosey & Hawkes, 1983)
- Noah Creshevsky: Loyal, Steady, Persistent (Boosey & Hawkes, 1983) (also part of Eleven Portraits for Orchestra)
- Sam Byers: With Joy (Boosey & Hawkes, 1983) (also part of Eleven Portraits for Orchestra)
- Morris Golde: Showing Delight (Boosey & Hawkes, 1983)
- Christopher Cox: Singing a Song (Boosey & Hawkes, 1983) (also part of Eleven Portraits for Orchestra)
- Barbara Epstein: Untiring (Boosey & Hawkes, 1983)
- Dead Pan: Mrs. Betty Freeman (Boosey & Hawkes, 1983) (also part of Eleven Portraits for Orchestra)
- John Wright, Drawing (Boosey & Hawkes, 1983)
- Franco Assetto, Drawing (Boosey & Hawkes, 1983)
- Round and Round: Dominique Mabokov (Boosey & Hawkes, 1983)
- Karen Brown Waltuck: Intensely Two (Boosey & Hawkes, 1983) (also part of Eleven Portraits for Orchestra)
- Anne-Marie Soullière: Something of a Beauty (Boosey & Hawkes, 1983)
- Buffie Johnson: Drawing V.T. in Charcoal (Boosey & Hawkes, 1983)
- Craig Rutenberg: Swinging (Boosey & Hawkes, 1983)
- Paul Sanfacon: On the Ice (Boosey & Hawkes, 1983)
- Molly Davies: Terminations (G. Schirmer, 1984)
- Dennis Russel Davies: In a Hammock (G. Schirmer, 1984) (also part of Eleven Portraits for Orchestra)
- Rodney Lister: Music for a Merry-Go-Round (G. Schirmer, 1984)
- Doña Flor: Receiving (G. Schirmer, 1984)
- Dr. Marcel Rochce: Making a Decision (G. Schirmer, 1984)
- David Dubal in Flight (G. Schirmer, 1984) (also part of Eleven Portraits for Orchestra)
- Peter McWilliams: Firmly Spontaneous (G. Schirmer, 1984)
- Vassilis Voglis: On the March (G. Schirmer, 1984)
- Power Boothe: With Pencil (G. Schirmer, 1984)
- Mark Beard: Never Alone (G. Schirmer, 1984)
- Louis Rispoli: In a Boat (G. Schirmer, 1984)
- Malitte Matta: In the Executive Style (G. Schirmer, 1984)
- Glynn Boyd Harte: Reaching (G. Schirmer, 1984)
- Senza Expressione: Bennett Lerner (G. Schirmer, 1984)
- Phillip Ramey: Thinking Hard (G. Schirmer, 1984)
- Charles, Fussell: In Meditation (G. Schirmer, 1984)
- Brendan Lemon: A Study Piece for Piano (G. Schirmer, 1984)
- John Houseman: No Changes (manuscript, 1984) (also part of A Pair of Portraits for Orchestra with the title A Double Take)
- Lines: for and about Ron Henggeler (manuscript, 1984()
- Boris Baranovic: Whirling (manuscript, 1984)
- Tony Tommasini: A Study in Chords (manuscript, 1984) (also part of A Pair of Portraits for Orchestra with the title Major Chords)
- Christopher Beach: Alone (manuscript, 1985)
- Danyal Lawson: Playing (manuscript 1985)

=== Chamber ensemble ===
- Sonata da Chiesa (Boosey & Hawkes, 1926, rev. 1973), for clarinet, trumpet, horn, trombone, viola
- Portraits for Violin Alone (Boosey & Hawkes, 1928; additional portrait added in 1940)
  1. Señorita Juanita de Medina Accompanied by Her Mother
  2. Madame Marthe-Marthine
  3. Georges Hugnet, Poet and Man of Letters
  4. Miss Gertrude Stein as a Young Girl
  5. Cliquet-Pleyel in F
  6. Mrs. C.W.L. (Chester Whitin Lasell)
  7. Sauguet, From Life
  8. Ruth Smallens (1940)
- Five Portraits for Four Clarinets (G. Schirmer, 1929) for SSAB clarinets
  1. Portrait of Ladies: A Conversation
  2. Portrait of a Young Man in Good Health: Maurice Grosser with a Cold
  3. Christian Bérard, Prisoner
  4. Christian Bérard as a Soldier
  5. Christian Bérard in Person
- Le Bains-Bar (manuscript, 1929) for Violin and Piano (also for piano quintet) [later arranged as At the Beach for trumpet and band (or piano)]
- Sonata for Violin and Piano (Boosey & Hawkes, 1930)
- Portraits for Violin and Piano (G. Schirmer, 1930; additional portrait added 1940) (ultimately published with a 1983 addition as Five Ladies)
  1. Alice Tolkas
  2. Mary Reynolds
  3. Anne Miracle
  4. Yvonne de Casa Fuerte (1940)
- String Quartet No. 1 (Boosey & Hawkes, 1931, rev. 1957)
- Serenade for Flute and Violin (Southern, 1931)
- String Quartet No. 2 (Boosey & Hawkes, 1932, rev. 1957) (later scored for orchestra as Symphony No. 3)
- Four Portraits, for cello and piano arranged in 1942 by Luigi Silva:
  1. Bugles and Birds (Pablo Picasso) (1940)
  2. Tango Lullaby (Flavie Alvarez de Toledo) (1940)
  3. In a Bird Cage (Lise Deharme) (1940)
  4. Fanfare for France (Max Kahn) (1940)
- Sonata for Flute Alone (Presser, 1943)
- Barcarolles for Woodwinds (G. Schirmer, 1944) for flute, oboe, English Horn, Clarinet, Bass Clarinet, Bassoon (orchestrated from piano portrait of George Hugnet)
- Fanfare for France (Boosey & Hawkes, 1944) orchestrated for brass and percussion from piano portrait of Max Kahn [one of ten fanfares commissioned by Cincinnati Symphony]
- Sonorous and Exquisite Corpses (Peters, 1944-1947) written collaboratively by John Cage, Henry Cowell, Lou Harrison and Virgil Thomson; orchestrated 1982 by Robert Hughes for flute/piccolo, clarinet, horn, bassoon, & piano and published as Party Pieces. (Exquisite corpse is a method by which the composers add to a composition in sequence: each would write a bar of music plus 2 notes, fold the paper at the bar, and pass it to the next composer, who would use the 2 notes as a base for continuing the composition.)
1. Vivace (Cage-Harrison)
2. Adagio (Thomson-Cage-Harrison)
3. Grazioso (Cowell-Cage-Harrison)
4. Allegretto (Thomson-Cage-Harrison)
5. Slowly, yet flowing (Thomson-Cage-Harrison)
6. Flowing-broad (Thomson-Cage-Harrison)
7. Allegro (Cage-Harrison)
8. Majestic-broad (Thomson-Cage-Harrison)
9. Vivo (Cowell-Cage-Harrison)
10. Flowing-rubato (Cowell-Cage-Harrison)
11. Waltz tempo (Thomson-Cage-Harrison)
12. Flowing (Cowell-Cage-Harrison)
13. Allegro (Cowell-Cage-Harrison)
14. A slow, walking tempo (Cowell-Cage-Harrison)
15. Maestoso, ma teneramente (Cowell-Cage-Harrison)
16. Allegro preciso (Cowell-Cage-Harrison)
17. March tempo (Cowell-Cage-Harrison)
18. Pastoral-softly-legato (Cowell-Cage-Harrison)
19. A slow 2-walking tempo (Cowell-Cage-Harrison)
20. Allegro (Cowell-Cage-Harrison)
- At the Beach (Carl Fischer, 1949) Concert Waltz for trumpet and band (or piano)
- Four Songs to Poems of Thomas Campion (Southern, 1951) mezzo-soprano, clarinet, viola and harp (or mezzo and piano)
- Lamentations, Etude for Accordion (Santee Music, 1959)
- Variations for Koto (manuscript, 1961)
- Ode to the Wonders of Nature (G. Schirmer, 1965) for brass and percussion
- Etude for Cello and Piano, a Portrait of Frederic James (manuscript, 1966)
- Metropolitan Museum Fanfare: Portrait of An American Artist (G. Schirmer, 1969) orchestrated for brass and percussion from piano portrait of Florine Stettheimer
- Family Portrait (G. Schirmer, 1974) for brass quintet
1. A Fanfare: Robin Smith
2. At Fourteen: Anne Barnard
3. Digging: A Portrait of Howard Rea
4. A Scherzo: Priscilla Rea
5. Man of Iron: Willy Eisenhart (from piano original)
- A Short Fanfare (manuscript, 1981) for 3 trumpets and 2 side drums
- Bell Piece (G. Schirmer, 1983) for carillon (2 or 4 players)
- Cynthia Kemper A Fanfare (G. Schirmer, 1983) for violin & piano (later published as part of Five Ladies)
- Lili Hastings (manuscript, 1983) violin and piano
- A Portrait of Two (G. Schirmer, 1984) for oboe, bassoon & piano
- Jay Rosen (manuscript, 1984) for tuba and piano
- Stockton Fanfare (Gentry Publications, 1985) for 3 trumpets and 2 side drums

== Discography ==
- Four Saints in Three Acts (1948, RCA Victor) – conductor

== Bibliography ==
Included among Virgil Thomson's publications are:

- Thomson, Virgil. (1940) The State of Music. New York. Morrow.
- —. (1945) The Musical Scene. New York. A. A. Knopf.
- —. (1948) The Art of Judging Music. New York. A. A. Knopf.
- —. (1951) Music, Right and Left. New York. Henry Holt and Co.
- —. (1966) Virgil Thomson. New York. Alfred A. Knopf.
- —. (1971) American Music Since 1910. New York. Holt Rinehart and Winston.
- —. (1981) A Virgil Thomson Reader. Boston. Houghton and Mifflin.
- —. (1989) Music With Words: A Composer's View. New Haven. Yale University Press.
