= Robert Craft =

American conductor and writer (1923–2015)

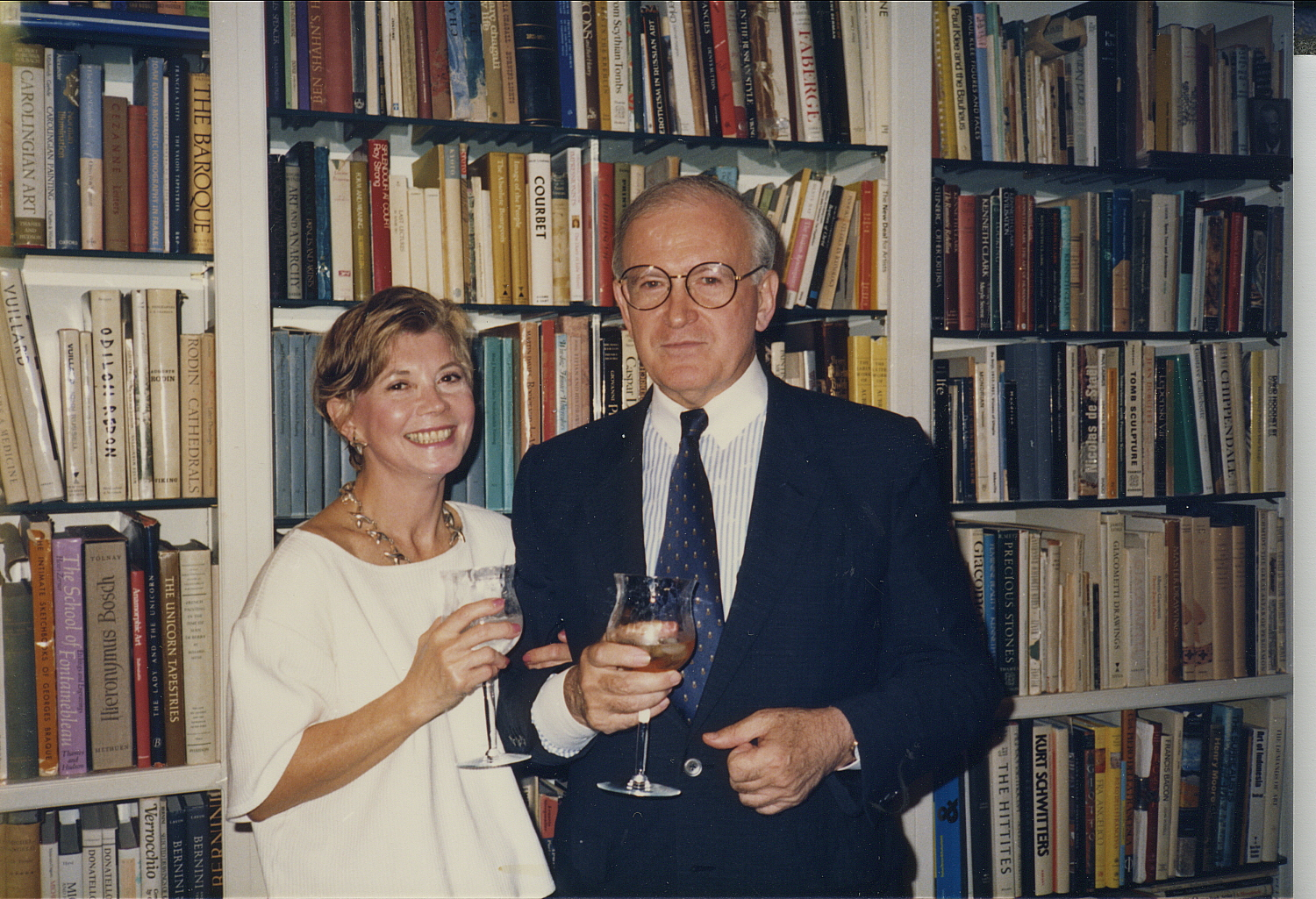
Robert Craft with his wife, Alva, at their home in Florida, circa early 1990s.

Robert Lawson Craft (October 20, 1923 – November 10, 2015) was an American conductor and writer. He is best known for his intimate professional relationship with Igor Stravinsky, on which Craft drew in producing numerous recordings and books.

== Life ==
Craft was born in Kingston, New York, to Raymond and Arpha Craft, and studied music at the Juilliard School. He became particularly interested in early music, such as that of Claudio Monteverdi, Carlo Gesualdo, and Heinrich Schütz, and in contemporary music by the composers of the Second Viennese School and others.

Craft met Stravinsky in 1948, and from then until the composer's death in 1971, Craft worked with Stravinsky in a variety of roles, eventually evolving into a full artistic partnership. Craft compiled the libretti for Stravinsky's The Flood and A Sermon, a Narrative and a Prayer, and lived with Igor and Vera Stravinsky in Hollywood and later in New York City. He remained close to the composer's widow until her death in 1982.

After Stravinsky's death, Craft continued to concertize and to write. His 2002 autobiography An Improbable Life details his life before, during, and after his friendship with Stravinsky. The memoir elaborates on the impact Stravinsky had on his life.

Shortly after Stravinsky's death, Craft married the composer's longtime nurse, Rita Christiansen, but the marriage did not endure. His survivors include a son from that marriage, Alexander; a sister, Phyllis Crawford; his second wife, the former Alva Celauro Minoff, a singer and actress; two stepchildren, Edward Minoff and Melissa Minoff; and four grandchildren.

Craft died on November 10, 2015, at age 92, at his home in Gulf Stream, Florida.

== Writing ==
Craft collaborated with Stravinsky on a series of books that covered various musical and non-musical subjects: Conversations with Igor Stravinsky (1959); Memories and Commentaries (1960); Expositions and Developments (1962); Dialogues and a Diary (1963); Themes and Episodes (1967); and Retrospectives and Conclusions (1969). They include transcribed conversations between the two men and interviews culled from various published sources, essays, diary entries, and the like, all with the professed aim of presenting Stravinsky's views on music and culture.

== Conducting ==
Craft conducted most of the major U.S. orchestras (New York Philharmonic, Philadelphia Orchestra, Chicago Symphony Orchestra, Cleveland Orchestra, San Francisco Symphony, Los Angeles Philharmonic, St. Louis Symphony, and Minneapolis Symphony Orchestra), as well as in Canada, Europe, Russia, Japan, Korea, Mexico, South America, Australia, and New Zealand. He was the first American to conduct Alban Berg's Wozzeck and Lulu and Hindemith's Cardillac. Craft also led the world premieres of Stravinsky's later, dodecaphonic works: Agon, The Flood, Abraham and Isaac, Variations, Introitus, Requiem Canticles, and his Bach orchestration Vom Himmel Hoch.

Craft was a two-time recipient of the Grand Prix du Disque, as well as the Edison Prize for his recordings of music by Varèse and Stravinsky. His recordings of the music of Stravinsky with the Orchestra of St. Luke's were originally available on 11 now out-of-print releases from MusicMasters and seven volumes from Koch. In the mid-1950s he recorded the complete works of Anton Webern. Since 2005, Naxos Records has gradually rereleased these recordings.

== Legacy ==
Craft remained in a vanguard position in relation to 20th-century art music throughout his life. Besides working closely with Stravinsky, he produced volumes of academic and personal writings on Stravinsky and other musicians and composers.

In 2002, Craft was awarded the International Prix du Disque at the Cannes Music Festival.

== Publications ==
- Prejudices in Disguise (New York, 1974)
- Stravinsky in Pictures and Documents (with Vera Stravinsky; New York, 1978)
- Current Convictions: Views and Reviews (New York, 1977)
- Igor and Vera Stravinsky (New York, 1982)
- Present Perspectives (New York, 1984)
- Small Craft Advisories (New York, 1989)
- Stravinsky: Glimpses of a Life (New York, 1992)
- Stravinsky: Chronicle of a Friendship (Nashville, 1994)
- Places: A Travel Companion for Music and Art Lovers (New York, 2000)
- Down a Path of Wonder (Norfolk, UK, 2006)

Craft also translated and edited Stravinsky, Selected Correspondence (3 vols., New York, 1982, 1984, 1985).

== Literature ==
- Craft, Robert. 2002. An Improbable Life: Memoirs. Nashville: Vanderbilt University Press. ISBN 0-8265-1381-6.
- Craft, Robert. 2013. Stravinsky: Discoveries and Memories. Naxos Books. ISBN 978-1-843797-53-1
