= List of compositions by Johann Strauss II =

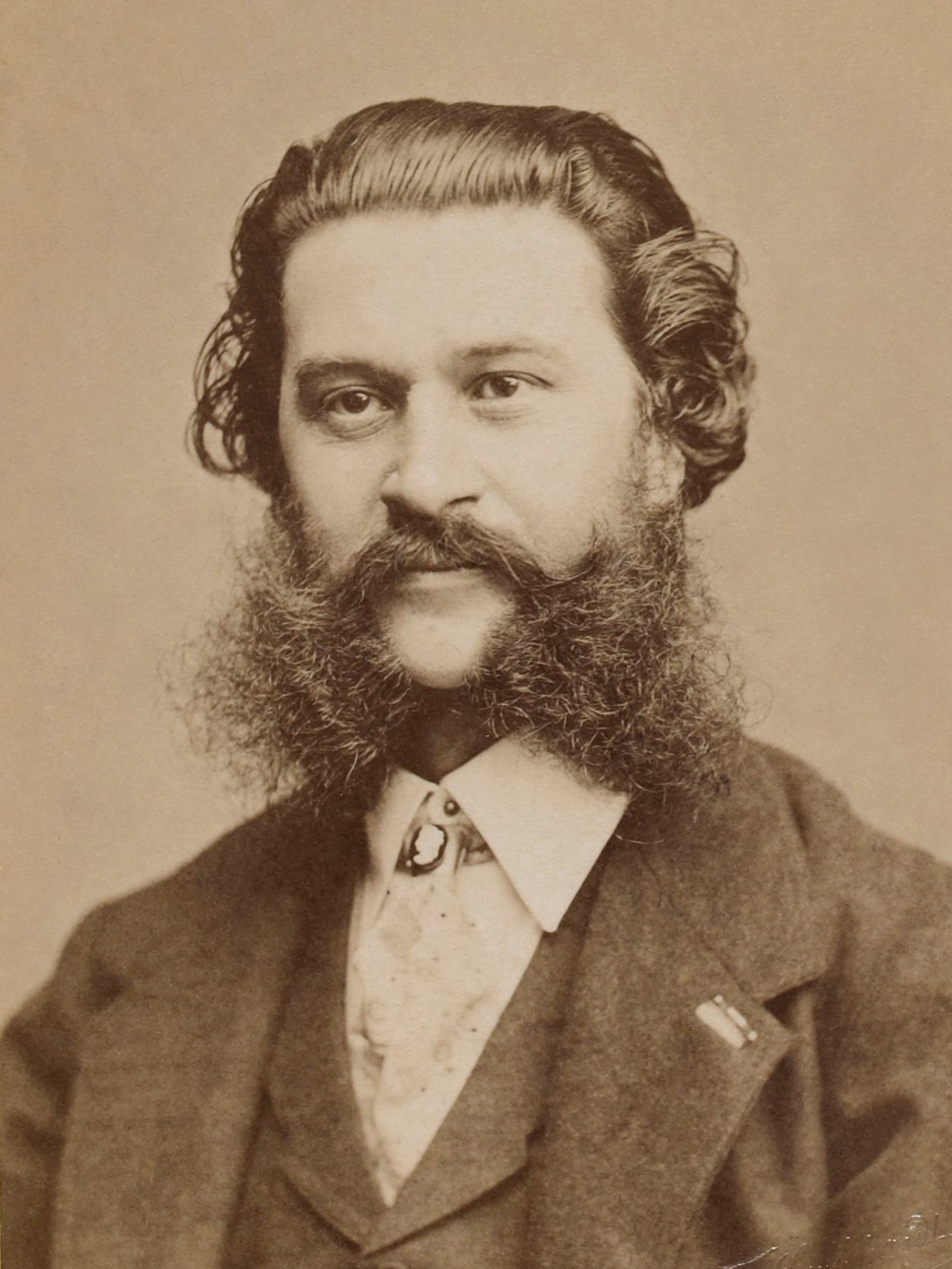
Johann Strauss II in 1876

This is a list of compositions by Johann Strauss II (1825–1899).

== Opera ==
- Ritter Pázmán (Knight Pázmán), comic opera in 3 acts, libretto by Lajos Dóczi, after János Arany (Vienna, 1892)

== Ballet ==
- Aschenbrödel Cinderella (1899)

== Symphonic poems ==
Traumbild I Dream Image (1896)

== Waltzes ==
- Erster Gedanke, "First Thought" (1831)
- Sinngedichte, Op. 1, Epigrams (1844)
- Gunstwerber, Op. 4, Wooers of Favour (1844)
- Serail-Tänze, Op. 5, Dances of the Harem (1844)
- Die Jungen Wiener, Op. 7, The Young Viennese (1845)
- Faschings-Lieder, Op. 11, Carnival Songs (1846)
- Jugendträume, Op. 12, Youthful Dreams (1846)
- Sträußchen, Op. 15, Bouquets (1846)
- Berglieder, Op. 18, Mountain Songs (1845)
- Lind-Gesänge, Op. 21, Lind's Song (1846)
- Die Oesterreicher, Op. 22, The Austrians (1845)
- Zeitgeister, Op. 25, Spirits of the Age (1846)
- Die Sanguiniker, Op. 27
- Die Zillerthaler, Walzer im Ländlerstil Op. 30
- Irenen-Walzer, Op. 32, Irene (1847)
- Die Jovialen, Walzer, Op. 34
- Architecten-Ball-Tänze, Op. 36
- Sängerfahrten, Op. 41, Singers' Journeys (1847)
- Wilde Rosen, Op. 42
- Ernte-Tänze, Op. 45
- Dorfgeschichten, Village Stories Op. 47
- Klange aus der Walachei, Op. 50, Echoes from Walachia (1850)
- Freiheits-Lieder, Songs of Liberty Op. 52
- Burschen-Lieder, Student Songs Op. 55
- Einheits-Klänge, Sounds of Unity Op. 62
- Fantasiebilder, Op. 64
- D'Woaldbuama, Die Waldbuben, Walzer im Ländlerstil, The Forest Lads, Waltz in the style of a country dance Op. 66
- Aeols-Töne, Aeolian Sounds Op. 68
- Die Gemüthlichen, Op. 70
- Frohsinns-Spenden, Op. 73, Gifts of Cheerfulness (1850)
- Lava-Ströme, Op. 74, Streams of Lava (1850)
- Maxing-Tänze, Op. 79
- Luisen-Sympathie-Klänge, Op. 81
- Johannis-Käferln, Fireflies Op. 82
- Heimaths-Kinder, Op. 85
- Aurora-Ball-Tänze, Op. 87
- Hirten-Spiele, Op. 89, Pastoral Play (1850/1851)
- Orakel-Sprüche, Oracles Op. 90
- Rhadamantus-Klänge, Op. 94, Echoes of Rhadamantus (1851)
- Idyllen, Op. 95, Idylls (1851)
- Frauenkäferln, Ladybugs Op. 99
- Mephistos Höllenrufe, Op. 101, Cries of Mephistopheles from Hell (1851)
- Liebeslieder, Op. 114, Lovesongs (1852)
- Phönix-Schwingen, Op. 125, Wings of the Phoenix (1853)
- Solon-Sprüche, Op. 128, Judgements of Solon (1853)
- Wiener Punch-Lieder, Op. 131, Vienna Punch Songs (1853)
- Vermählungs-Toaste, Op. 136, Wedding Toasts (1853)
- Knallkügerln, Op. 140, Firecracker (1853)
- Wellen und Wogen, Op. 141, Waves and Billows (1853)
- Schnee-Glöckchen, Op. 143, Snowdrops (1854)
- Novellen, Op. 146, Legal Amendments (1854)
- Ballg'schichten, Op. 150, Tales of the Ball (1854)
- Myrthen-Kränze, Op. 154, Myrtle Wreaths (1855)
- Nachtfalter, Op. 157, Moths (1855)
- Glossen, Op. 163, Marginal Notes (1855)
- Man lebt nur einmal!, Op. 167, You Only Live Once! (1855)
- Gedanken auf den Alpen, Op. 172, Thoughts in the Alps (1856)
- Juristenball-Tänze, Op. 177, Jurists' Ball Dances (1856)
- Abschieds-Rufe, Op. 179, Cries of Farewell (1856)
- Grossfürstin Alexandra, Op. 181, Grand Duchess Alexandra's Waltz (1856)
- Krönungslieder, Op. 184, Coronation Songs (1857)
- Paroxysmen, Op. 189, Paroxysms (1857)
- Controversen, Op. 191, Controversies (1857)
- Wien, mein Sinn!, Op. 192, Vienna, my soul! (1857)
- Phänomene, Op. 193, Phenomena (1857)
- Telegrafische Depeschen, Op. 195, Telegraphic Despatches (1858)
- Souvenir de Nizza, Op. 200, Souvenir of Nice (1858)
- Vibrationen, Op. 204, Vibrations (1858)
- Abschied von St. Petersburg, Op. 210, Farewell to Saint Petersburg (1858)
- Gedankenflug, Op. 215, Thoughtless Flights (1859)
- Hell und voll, Op. 216, Bright and Full (1859)
- Irrlichter, Op. 218, Will-o-wisps (1859)
- Promotionen, Op. 221, Graduations (1859)
- Schwungräder, Op. 223, Flywheels (1859)
- Reiseabenteuer Walzer, Op. 227, Travel Adventures Waltz (1859)
- Lebenswecker, Op. 232, Life's Awakener (1860)
- Accelerationen, Op. 234, Accelerations (1860)
- Immer heiterer, Op. 235, More and More Cheerful (1860)
- Thermen Walzer, Op. 245, Thermen Waltz
- Grillenbanner, Op. 247, Banisher of Gloom (1861)
- Wahlstimmen, Op. 250, Votes Waltz (1861)
- Klangfiguren, Op. 251, Sound Figures (1861)
- Dividenden, Op. 252, Dividends (1861)
- Schwärmereien, Op. 253 (1861/1862)
- Die ersten Curen Walzer, Op. 261 The First Cure Waltz (1861/1862)
- Colonnen Walzer, Op. 262, Columns Waltz (1862)
- Patronessen, Op. 264, Patronesses (1862)
- Concurrenzen, Op. 267, Rivalry (1862)
- Wiener Chronik, Op. 268, Vienna Chronicle (1862)
- Karnevalsbotschafter, Op. 270, Carnival Ambassador (1862)
- Leitartikel, Op. 273, Leading Article (1863)
- Morgenblätter, Op. 279, Morning Journals (1863)
- Studentenlust, Op. 285, Students' Joy (1864)
- Aus den Bergen, Op. 292, From the Mountains (1864)
- Feuilleton, Op. 293, (1865)
- Bürgersinn, Op. 295, Citizen Spirit (1865)
- Flugschriften, Op. 300, Pamphlets (1865)
- Wiener Bonbons, Op. 307, Viennese Sweets (1866)
- Feenmärchen, Op. 312, Fairytales (1866)
- An der schönen blauen Donau, Op. 314, On the Beautiful Blue Danube, or The Blue Danube (1866)
- Künstlerleben, Op. 316, Artists' Life (1867)
- Telegramme, Op. 318, Telegrams (1867)
- Die Publicisten, Op. 321, The Publicists (1868)
- G'schichten aus dem Wienerwald, Op. 325, Tales from the Vienna Woods (1868)
- Illustrationen, Op. 331, Illustrations (1869)
- Wein, Weib und Gesang, Op. 333, Wine, Women and Song (1869)
- Königslieder, Op. 334, Songs for a King (1869)
- Freuet euch des Lebens, Op. 340, Enjoy Life (1870)
- Neu Wien, Op. 342, New Vienna (1870)
- Tausend und eine Nacht, Op. 346, Thousand and One Nights (1871)
- Autograph Waltzes without opus number (1872)
- Farewell to America without opus number (1872)
- Wiener Blut, Op. 354, Viennese Blood (1873)
- Carnevalsbilder, Op. 357, Carnival Pictures (1873)
- Bei uns z'Haus, Op. 361, At Home (1873)
- Wo die Zitronen blühen, Op. 364, Where the Lemons Blossom (1874)
- Du und du from Die Fledermaus, Op. 367, You and you (1874)
- Cagliostro-Walzer, Op. 370 (1875)
- O schöner Mai!, Op. 375, Oh Lovely May! (1877)
- Kennst du mich?, Op. 381, Do you know me? (1878)
- Rosen aus dem Süden, Op. 388, Roses from the South (1880)
- Nordseebilder, Op. 390, North Sea Pictures (1880)
- Myrthenblüten, Op. 395, Myrtle Blossoms (1881)
- Kuss-Walzer, Op. 400, Kiss Waltz (1881)
- Italienischer Walzer, Op. 407, Italian Waltz (1882)
- Frühlingsstimmen, Op. 410, Voices of Spring (1882)
- Lagunen-Walzer, Op. 411, Lagoon Waltz (1883)
- Schatz-Walzer, Op. 418, Treasure Waltz (1885)
- Wiener Frauen, Op. 423, Viennese Ladies (1886)
- Donauweibchen, Op. 427, Danube Maiden (1887)
- Kaiser-Jubiläum-Jubelwalzer, Op. 434, Emperor Jubilation (1888)
- Kaiser-Walzer, Op. 437, Emperor Waltz (1888)
- Rathausball-Tänze, Op. 438, City Hall Ball (1890)
- Gross-Wien, Op. 440, Great Vienna (1891)
- Seid umschlungen, Millionen!, Op. 443, Be Embraced, You Millions! (1892)
- Märchen aus dem Orient, Op. 444, Tales from the Orient (1892)
- Hochzeitsreigen, Op. 453, Wedding Dance (1893)
- Ich bin dir gut (Jakuba Waltz), Op. 455 (1894)
- Gartenlaube Waltz, Op. 461 Garden Leaves (1894)
- Klug Gretelein, Op. 462, Clever Gretel (1895)
- Trau, schau, wem!, Op. 463, Take Care in Whom You Trust! (1895)
- Heut' ist Heut', Op. 471, Today is Today (1897)
- An der Elbe, Op. 477, On the Elbe (1898)
- Klänge aus der Raimundzeit, Op. 479, Echoes from the days of Raimund (1898)
- Tauben-Walzer Op. posth. Village Swallows (1901)

== Polkas ==
- Herzenslust, Op. 3, Heart's Content (1844)
- Amazonen-Polka, Op. 9
- Czechen-Polka, Op. 13, Czech Polka (1845)
- Bachus-Polka, Op. 38, Bacchus (1847)
- Explosions-Polka, Op. 43
- Warschauer Polka, Op. 84, Warsaw Polka
- Harmonie Polka, Op. 106
- Elektro-magnetische, Op. 110 Electro-magnetic (1852)
- Blumenfest, Op. 111, Flower Festival (1852)
- Annen, Op. 117, Anna (1852)
- Zehner-Polka, Op. 121, The Ten (1852)
- Veilchen, Op. 132, Violets
- Neuhauser-Polka, Op. 137, Neuhaus (1853)
- Schnellpost-Polka, Op. 159 (1855)
- Souvenir-Polka, Op. 162
- Aurora, Op. 165
- Alexandrinen-Polka, polka-française, Op. 198 (1858)
- L'Enfantillage, polka-française, Op. 202, Child's Play (1858)
- Hellenen-Polka, for orchestra, Op. 203
- Champagner-Polka, Op. 211 (1858)
- Tritsch-Tratsch-Polka, Op. 214, Chit-chat (1858)
- Gruß an Wien, Op. 225, Greetings to Vienna (1859)
- Jäger-Polka, polka-française, Op. 229, Hunter's Polka (1859)
- Drollerie-Polka, Op. 231, Drollery (1860)
- Maskenzug, Op. 240, Masked Ball (1860)
- Perpetuum Mobile, Op. 257 (1861)
- Furioso-Polka (quasi galopp), Op 260, (1861)
- Studenten-Polka (française), Op. 263 (1862)
- Demolirer-Polka, polka-française, Op. 269, Demolition Men (1862)
- Bluette polka-française, Op. 271
- Vergnügungszug, Op. 281, Journey Train (1864)
- Gut bürgerlich, polka-française, Op. 282, Respectable Citizenry (1864)
- Patronessen-Polka, Op. 286, polka-française (1864)
- 'S gibt nur a Kaiserstadt, 's gibt nur a Wien!, Op. 291, Only one Imperial City, one Vienna
- Elektrophor, polka-schnell, Op. 297, Electrophorous (1865)
- Kreuzfidel, Op. 301, Cross-Fiddling
- Express, polka-schnell, Op. 311
- Lob der Frauen polka-mazurka, Op. 315, Praise of Women
- Postillon d'amour polka-française, Op. 317 (1867)
- Leichtes Blut, polka-schnell, Op. 319, Light Blood (1867)
- Figaro-Polka, Op. 320 (1867)
- Stadt und Land polka-mazurka, Op. 322, Town and Country
- Ein Herz, ein Sinn! polka-mazurka, Op. 323, One Heart, One Mind!
- Unter Donner und Blitz, Op. 324, Thunder & Lightning (1868)
- Freikugeln, Op. 326, Free-shooter (1868)
- Fata Morgana, Op. 330
- Éljen a Magyar! polka-schnell, Op. 332, Long live the Magyar!
- Im Krapfenwald'l polka-française, Op. 336, In Krapfen's Woods (1869)
- Von Der Börse polka-française, Op. 337, From The Bourse (1869)
- Louischen polka-française, Op. 339 (1869)
- Im Sturmschritt, Op. 348, At the Double!
- Die Bajadere, Op. 351, The Bayadere
- Vom Donaustrande, Op. 356, By the Danube's Shores
- Gruß aus Österreich polka-mazurka, Op. 359
- Fledermaus-Polka, Op. 362 (1874)
- Tik-Tak-Polka, polka-schnell, Op. 365 (1874), based on themes from Die Fledermaus
- Glücklich ist, wer vergisst! polka-mazurka, Op. 368, Happy is he who forgets! (1874)
- Bitte schön! polka-française, Op. 372, If You Please! (1875)
- Auf der Jagd, Op. 373, On the Hunt! (1875)
- Licht und Schatten, Op. 374, Light and Shadow (1875)
- Banditen-Galopp, Op. 378, Bandits' Galop (1877)
- Kriegers Liebchen, polka-mazurka, Op. 379, Soldier's Sweetheart (fashioned from themes in the operetta Prinz Methusalem, 1877)
- Pariser polka-française, Op. 382, Paris (1878)
- Waldine, Op. 385 (1879)
- Pizzicato-Polka (1869, no opus number; written in collaboration with his brother Josef Strauss)
- So Ängstlich sind wir nicht, Op. 413 (Schnell-Polka (Galopp) from the comic operetta Eine Nacht in Venedig )
- Annina, polka-Mazurka, Op. 415 (1883)
- Durch's Telephon, Op. 439, Over the Telephone (1890)
- Neue Pizzicato Polka, Op. 449, New Pizzicato Polka
- Sonnenblume, polka-mazurka, Op.459
- Klipp-Klapp Galopp, Op. 466

== Marches ==
- Patrioten, Op. 8 (1845)
- Austria, Op. 20 (1846)
- Fest, Op. 49 (1847)
- Revolutions-Marsch, Op. 54 (1848)
- Studenten-Marsch, Op. 56, Students' March (1848)
- Brünner Nationalgarde, Op. 58, Brno National Guard (1848)
- Kaiser-Franz-Joseph-Jubiläums-Marsch, no Op. (1848)
- Kaiser-Franz-Joseph-Marsch, Op. 67 (1849)
- Triumph, Op. 69 (1850)
- Wiener Garnison, Op. 77, Viennese Garrison (1850)
- Ottinger-Reiter-Marsch, Op. 83 (1850)
- Kaiser-Jäger, Op. 93 (1851)
- Viribus unitis, Op. 96, "With United Strength" (1851)
- Grossfürsten, Op. 107 (1852)
- Sachsen-Kürassier, Op. 113, Saxon-Cuirassiers (1852)
- Wiener Jubel-Gruss, Op. 115, Viennese Joyful Greetings (1852)
- Kaiser-Franz-Josef-Rettungs-Jubel, Op. 126, Joy at Deliverance of Emperor Franz Josef (1853)
- Caroussel, Op. 133, Carousel (1853)
- Kron, Op. 139 (1853)
- Erzherzog-Wilhelm-Genesungs-Marsch, Op. 149 (1854)
- Napoleon, Op. 156 (1854)
- Alliance-Marsch, Op. 158 (1854)
- Krönungs, Op. 183, Coronation (1856)
- Fürst Bariatinsky, Op. 212 (1858)
- Deutscher Kriegermarsch, Op. 284 (1864)
- Verbrüderungs-Marsch, Op. 287, Fraternization (1864)
- Persischer Marsch, Op. 289, Persian March (1864)
- Kaiser-Alexander-Huldings-Marsch, op. 290 Tsar Alexander Homage March (1864)
- Egyptischer Marsch, Op. 335, Egyptian March (1869)
- Indigo-Marsch, Op. 349, (from Indigo und die vierzig Rauber) (1871)
- Russische Marsch-Fantasie, Op. 353, Russian March-Fantasy (1872)
- Hoch Osterreich!, Op. 371, Hail Austria (from Cagliostro in Wien)
- Jubelfest, Op. 396, Jubilee Festival (1881)
- Der lustige Krieg, Op. 397 (1882)
- Matador, Op. 406, (on Themes from Das Spitzentuch der Königin) (1883)
- Habsburg hoch!, Op. 408, Hail Habsburg (1882)
- Aufzugsmarsch (from Indigo und die vierzig Rauber) (1883)
- Einzugsmarsch aus Der Zigeunerbaron (1885)
- Russischer Marsch, Op. 426, Russian March (1886)
- Reiter, Op. 428, (from Simplicius) (1888)
- Spanischer Marsch, Op. 433, Spanish March (1888)
- Fest, Op. 452, Festival (1893)
- Živio!, Op. 456, Your Health (probably 1894)
- Es war so wunderschön, Op. 467, It Was So Wonderful (from Waldmeister) (1896)
- Deutschmeister Jubiläums, Op. 470 (1896)
- Auf's Korn!, Op. 478, Take Aim! (1898)

== Quadrilles ==
- Debut-Quadrille, Op. 2 (1844)
- Cytheren-Quadrille, Op. 6 (1844; 1845)
- Serben-Quadrille, Op. 14 (1846)
- Odeon-Quadrille, Op. 29 (1846)
- Zigeunerin-Quadrille, Op. 24 (1846)
- Wilhelminen-Quadrille, Op. 37 (1847) named after the spouse, Wilhelmina, of the dance master Eduard Webersfeld, the work's dedicatee
- Sans-Souci-Quadrille, Op. 63, Carefree (1849)
- Künstler-Quadrille (Artists' Quadrille), Op. 71 (1850)
- Sofien-Quadrille, Op. 75, Sophie (1850)
- Nocturne-Quadrille Op. 120 (1853)
- Le beau monde (Fashionable Society), Op. 199 (1857)
- Künstler-Quadrille, Op. 201 (1858)
- Dinorah-Quadrille, Op. 224, after motifs from the opera Dinorah, oder Die Wallfahrt nach Ploërmel
- New melodies Quadrille op. 254, after italian opera works
- Slovanka-Quadrille, Op. 338, after Russian motifs
- Indigo-Quadrille, Op. 344 (1871)
- Fledermaus-Quadrille, Op. 363 (1874)
- Cagliostro-Quadrille, Op. 369 (1875)
