= Die Publicisten =

1868 waltz by Johann Strauss II

"Die Publicisten" (The Publicists, Op. 321) is a waltz by Johann Strauss II composed in 1868. It was written for the sixth Concordia Ball held in the Sofienbad-Saal on the 4 February of the same year. The waltz's title was an allusion to Vienna's press, with whom he maintained a fruitful partnership that his family had enjoyed since the days of his father Johann Strauss I. The more or less symbiotic association was needed as the musical business of composers would inevitably flourish under favorable press reviews and the establishment of the Vienna Journalists' and Authors' Association in 1859 would signify an even more closer relationship between both composer and the press. The Concordia Ball named after the Roman God of civic concord had its first ball in 1863.

This waltz came at a time when Strauss' creative genius was at its pinnacle, with the famous waltzes Wiener Bonbons Op. 307, The Blue Danube An der Schönen Blauen Donau Op. 314 and Künstlerleben Op. 316 already completed, with the more compelling G'schichten aus dem Wienerwald waltz Op. 325 and the Wein, Weib und Gesang waltz op. 333 still to come. It also made a brief appearance in the pastiche ballet Graduation Ball by Antal Doráti in the "Perpetuum Mobile dance" number 10.

"Die Publicisten" is composed in the typical five two-part sections waltz (hereinafter referred as waltz A and waltz B). The waltz's introduction was announced with trumpets and other brass instruments before a brief accelerating march melody halts and the waltz themes start. Waltz 1A begins in a hesitant manner while waltz 1B is more flowing but not overly joyous. Waltz 2A intertwine between these moods but rushes to a joyful Waltz 2B. A brief waltz beat intrada ushers in the solemn and plaintive Waltz 3A and the gentler but noticeably happier section 3B. Another brief intrada brings in the cheeky-sounding waltz 4A whereas 4B is accompanied by triangles while the unobtrusive mood of the piece continues. Yet another brief intrada brings in the peaceful waltz 5A while in the final section 5B, Strauss allows the genial nature of the piece to unfold until the coda. After the brief but restless-sounding coda, the entire waltzes 2A and 2B are repeated once. The first section is played again before rushing into an exciting and joyous conclusion, with the typical snare drum roll and the brass flourish.
