= August Schmidt =

August Schmidt may refer to:

- August Schmidt (Wehrmacht) (1892–1972), German general
- August Schmidt (Luftwaffe) (1883–1955), German general
- August Schmidt (journalist) (1808–1891), Austrian music writer, journalist and musician
- Carl August von Schmidt or August Schmidt (1840–1929), German geophysicist and meteorologist
