= Op. 157 =

In music, Op. 157 stands for Opus number 157. Compositions that are assigned this number include:

- Ries – Der Sieg des Glaubens
- Saint-Saëns – Fantaisie No. 3 in C major
- Strauss – Nachtfalter
