= Op. 247 =

In music, Op. 247 stands for Opus number 247. Compositions that are assigned this number include:

- Milhaud – Symphony No. 2
- Strauss – Grillenbanner
