= Vergissmeinnicht =

Vergissmeinnicht, Vergißmeinnicht, or Vergiss mein nicht may refer to:

- The forget-me-not flower, whose German name is das Vergissmeinnicht
- Vergiss mein nicht, several pieces by Johann Sebastian Bach
- "Vergissmeinnicht" (A flat major D792), an 1823 composition by Schubert
- Vergissmeinnicht (Eisbrecher song), 1845
- Vergissmeinnicht, a poem by British war poet Keith Douglas
- Vergißmeinnicht, WAB 93, an 1845 cantata by Anton Bruckner
- "Vergiß mein nicht", the original title of "'S gibt nur a Kaiserstadt, 's gibt nur a Wien!", an 1864 polka by Johann Strauss II
- Vergissmeinnicht, a composition by Henry Litolff
- Vergiß mein nicht (XXVIa:46), a c. 1796 composition by Joseph Haydn
- Vergiss mein nicht, a 2018 album by Andreas Gabalier
- Vergissmeinnicht, a periodic publication by German novelist Karl Spindler
