= Op. 94 =

In music, Op. 94 stands for Opus number 94. Compositions that are assigned this number include:

- Britten – String Quartet No. 3
- Prokofiev – Flute Sonata
- Prokofiev – Violin Sonata No. 2
- Schumann – Three Romances for Oboe and Piano
- Strauss – Rhadamantus-Klänge
