= Op. 390 =

In music, Op. 390 stands for Opus number 390. Compositions that are assigned this number include:

- Milhaud – Symphony No. 12
- Strauss – Nordseebilder
