= Op. 125 =

In music, Op. 125 stands for Opus number 125. Compositions that are assigned this number include:

- Beethoven – Symphony No. 9
- Prokofiev – Symphony-Concerto
- Reger – Eine romantische Suite
- Ries – Cello Sonata No. 4
- Schumann – 5 heitere Gesänge
- Straus II – Phönix-Schwingen
