= Op. 146 =

In music, Op. 146 stands for Opus number 146. Compositions that are assigned this number include:

- Reger – Clarinet Quintet
- Schumann – Romanzen und Balladen, Vol. V
- Strauss – Novellen
