= Op. 101 =

In music, Op. 101 stands for Opus number 101. Compositions that are assigned this number include:

- Beethoven – Piano Sonata No. 28
- Brahms – Piano Trio No. 3
- Dvořák – Humoresques
- Schumann – Minnespiel (4 songs, 2 duets, 2 quartets)
- Shostakovich – String Quartet No. 6
- Strauss – Mephistos Höllenrufe
