= Op. 210 =

In music, Op. 210 stands for Opus number 210. Compositions that are assigned this number include:

- Milhaud – Symphony No. 1
- Strauss – Abschied von St. Petersburg
