= Op. 315 =

In music, Op. 315 stands for Opus number 315. Compositions that are assigned this number include:

- Davies – Symphony No. 9
- Strauss – Lob der Frauen
