= Die Bajadere =

Die Bajadere is the name of two musical works:

- "Die Bajadere" (polka) by Johann Strauss II (1871)
- Die Bajadere (operetta) by Emmerich Kálmán (1921)

== See also ==
- La Bayadère (ballet) by Marius Petipa (1877)
