= Op. 74 =

In music, Op. 74 stands for Opus number 74. Compositions that are assigned this number include:

- Arnold – Symphony No. 5
- Beethoven – String Quartet No. 10
- Brahms – Two Motets, Op. 74
- Britten – Songs and Proverbs of William Blake
- Chopin – 17 Polish songs
- Dvořák – Terzetto in C major
- Glière – Harp Concerto
- Madetoja – Juha, opera in three acts (1934)
- Prokofiev – Cantata for the 20th Anniversary of the October Revolution
- Schumann – Spanisches Liederspiel (3 songs, 5 duets, 2 quartets)
- Scriabin – Prelude, Op. 74, No. 2
- Strauss – Lava-Ströme
- Tchaikovsky – Symphony No. 6
- Weber – Clarinet Concerto No. 2
