= Op. 73 =

In music, Op. 73 stands for Opus number 73. Compositions that are assigned this number include:

- Beethoven – Piano Concerto No. 5
- Brahms – Symphony No. 2
- Czerny – Variations on "Gott erhalte Franz den Kaiser"
- Draeseke – Tod und Sieg des Herrn
- Krenek – Karl V
- Novák – May Symphony
- Schumann – Fantasiestücke, Op. 73
- Shostakovich – String Quartet No. 3
- Sibelius – The Oceanides (Aallottaret), tone poem for orchestra (1914, revised 1914)
- Strauss – Frohsinns-Spenden
- Weber – Clarinet Concerto No. 1
