= Op. 95 =

In music, Op. 95 stands for Opus number 95. Compositions that are assigned this number include:

- Arnold – Symphony No. 6
- Beethoven – String Quartet No. 11
- Dvořák – Symphony No. 9
- Schumann – 3 Gesänge
- Sibelius – Hymn of the Earth (Maan virsi), cantata for mixed choir and orchestra (1920)
- Stanford – Serenade in F major
- Strauss – Idyllen
- Tcherepnin – Chinese Songs
