= Op. 15 =

In music, Op. 15 stands for Opus number 15. Compositions that are assigned this number include:

- Alkan – Trois morceaux dans le genre pathétique
- Bartók – Five Songs, Op. 15
- Beethoven - Piano Concerto No. 1
- Brahms – Piano Concerto No. 1
- Britten – Violin Concerto
- Chopin – Nocturnes, Op. 15
- Dvořák – Ballade
- Elgar – Chanson de Nuit
- Fauré – Piano Quartet No. 1
- Gál – Die heilige Ente
- Gottschalk – The Banjo
- Madetoja – Kullervo, symphonic poem for orchestra (1913)
- Myaskovsky – Symphony No. 3
- Berlioz – Grande symphonie funèbre et triomphale
- Saint-Saëns – Serenade in E-flat major
- Schoenberg – The Book of the Hanging Gardens
- Schubert – Wanderer Fantasy
- Schumann – Kinderszenen
- Shostakovich – The Nose
- Sibelius – The Wood Nymph (Skogsrået), tone poem for orchestra (1895)
- Somov – Winternacht
- Strauss – Sträußchen
- Szymanowski – Symphony No. 1
- Weill – Der Protagonist
