= Promotionen =

Promotionen (Graduations), Op. 221, is the name of a waltz composed by Johann Strauss II. It was dedicated to the law students at Vienna University, and was first performed under the title of Die Präparanden, a term referring to students who are preparing for their final examinations. The waltz was not very successful when first performed in the Sofienbad-Saal on February 8, 1859: the Fremden-Blatt, although praising the execution of the waltz, said that it "lacked the rhythm and melody of older Strauss compositions." However, a reviewer for the Wiener Allgemeine Theaterzeitung was less critical of the composition, commenting that "in particular the first, third and fifth [waltz sections] are rich in fresh and attractive melodies [...] through this composition Strauss has lately demonstrated that he still has at his disposal a profusion of piquant and original melodies."

The Promotionen waltz soon fell out of the Strauss Orchestra's repertoire, but the composer later resurrected one of its melodies (Waltz 5A) for his composition Farewell to America, which was written a decade later.
