= Ein Herz, ein Sinn! =

Ein Herz, ein Sinn! (One Heart, one Mind!), opus 323 is a polka-mazurka composed by Johann Strauss II in 1868 belonging to a period of creativity of the composer. Strauss dedicated this piece to 'the Committee of the Citizen's Ball' which was held at the Imperial Redoutensaal on 11 February 1868 where on occasion he had earlier also dedicated his waltz Bürgersinn (op. 295).

Its themes have been selected as material for the operetta Wiener Blut (1899) of which Strauss himself did not compose any new music, instead relying on Adolf Müller Jr. to arrange from Strauss' previous compositions.

Strauss' tranquil polka-mazurka begins in C major with a Trio section in F major. Throughout the piece, the mood is generally happy although these are never outright cheerful nor triumphant and the finale is a gentle affirmation of these. The polka-mazurka has often been transcribed for piano solos.
