= Immer heiterer =

Immer heiterer ('More and More Cheerful') op. 235 is a waltz written by Johann Strauss II in 1860 for the Vienna Carnival Fasching. The waltz was marked as "im ländlerstil" which meant that it was to be performed in the same style as the ländler.

The work was first performed at the genial 'Strauss Ball' in the famous 'Sperl' ballroom in Vienna's Leopoldstadt and was popular when first performed although its 'twin' work, which is the compelling Accelerationen op. 234 won much acclaim.

The most significant section of the waltz can be heard in the coda (tail-piece) where Strauss called for the members of the orchestra to give a chorus of laughter in spirit of the work.
