= Kuss-Walzer =

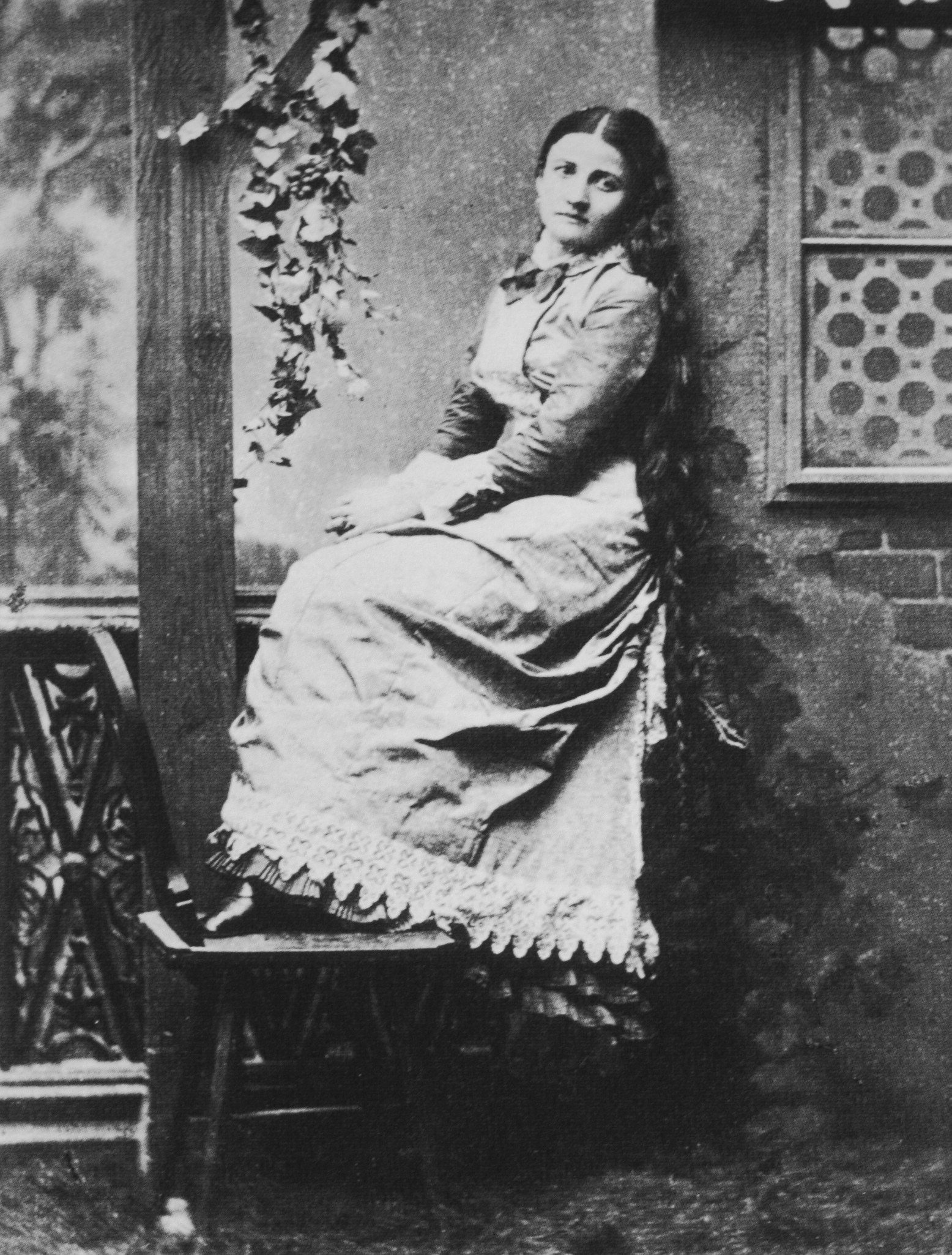
Angelika Dittrich

The Kuss-Walzer (Kiss Waltz), Op. 400 is a waltz by Johann Strauss II composed in 1881. The waltz was originally dedicated to his second wife, Angelika Dittrich (1850–1919), but Strauss withdrew that dedication after their divorce in 1882. The waltz comprises melodies from Strauss' popular operetta Der lustige Krieg (The Merry War) and is an orchestral treatment of the act 2 aria "Nur für Natur" which was a hit when first performed. Eduard Strauss, the composer's brother, first conducted the orchestral piece at the Court Ball in Vienna in 1882.

== Piece ==
Introduction

The introduction consists of arresting chords in the key of G major before proceeding discreetly into a quiet yet poignant waltz theme. The Kiss Waltz differs from Strauss' other waltzes in that the first theme recurs very often, and there are only three other waltz sections of which the first theme would be played again after concluding those successive sections. Despite being of such an economical structure, the waltz was well received at its first performance.
