= Gross-Wien =

Waltz by Johann Strauss II

Gross-Wien Op. 440 is a waltz by Johann Strauss II written in 1891 and was a choral waltz for the Wiener Männergesang-Verein (Vienna Men's Choral Association) during the Vienna Fasching (Carnival) of the same year. The text for the choral version of the waltz was by Franz von Gernerth.

The waltz's title was a chronicle of events in and around Vienna as the Imperial City underwent vast development through the years. Although the waltz was intended as a choral work for the association, its first performance was actually at the Vienna Prater, on 10 May 1891 for a 'Monster Concert' of over 500 musicians from the combined military orchestras of Vienna under Strauss' baton. The premiere of the waltz in its orchestral version was also without chorus, as the planned performance with chorus had been delayed until 4 October of the same year, taking place at the Sängerhalle under the direction of chorus-master Eduard Kremser.

The first performance at the Prater was also attended by the Austrian ruling family, as well as the King and Queen of Denmark and the Duke and Duchess of Cumberland. Strauss' waltz brims with a confidence typical of his maturity, containing musical ideas that are never trite, although he wrote waltzes at a prodigious rate.
