= Paroxysmen =

Waltz composed by Johann Strauss II

Paroxysmen (Paroxysms), opus 189, is a waltz composed by Johann Strauss II. It was dedicated to the Gentlemen Students of Medicine at Vienna University on the occasion of a ball held in the Sofienbad-Saal in January 1857. A critic of the newspaper Fremden-Blatt commented on the waltz: "The day before yesterday the Medical Students' Ball opened the season in the Sofienbad-Saal, which made the ball especially interesting when one saw for the first time the new and sumptuously decorated locale. The dance hall is newly hung throughout with red and gold drapery, the ceiling very tastefully prepared. Little statues, surrounded by flowers and leaves, heighten the appeal of the decorations. The music was personally conducted by Strauss and his waltz 'Paroxysmen', written especially for this ball, belongs to his best compositions."
