= O schöner Mai! =

1877 waltz composed by Johann Strauss II

O schöner Mai! (Oh Lovely May!), Op. 375, is a waltz composed by Johann Strauss II. It features melodies from Strauss's fifth operetta, Prinz Methusalem. The waltz was first performed in January 1877, with Eduard Strauss conducting. The principal waltz theme of this work is a quote from the Act 3 duet for Pulcinella and Methusalem ("O du, O du, me in Feldmarschall"), while the remaining melodies are taken from Acts 1 and 2, including the Act 1 Chorus and Ensemble, "O schöner Mai!".
