= Trau, schau, wem! =

Trau, schau, wem! (Take Care in Whom You Trust!), Op. 463, is a waltz composed by Johann Strauss II. The composition was dedicated to the portrait painter Franz von Lenbach. It was based on melodies from Strauss's operetta Waldmeister – the work is therefore also known as "Waldmeister Walzer". It premiered on 15 December 1895 in the Golden Hall of the Vienna Musikverein, conducted by Eduard Strauss.
