= Lava-Ströme =

Lava-Ströme (Streams of Lava), opus 74, is the name of a waltz composed by Johann Strauss II. It was written to commemorate the volcanic activity within Vesuvius in 1850. The waltz was first performed at a benefit ball going under the title of a "Ball in Vesuvius" at the Sofienbad-Saal in Vienna on January 29, 1850.

Lava-Ströme was one of the more imaginative of Strauss' waltzes, having a dramatic 105-bar introduction symbolising the eruption of the volcano. The opening waltz melody was used in Eduard Strauss' musical potpourri Bluthenkranz Johann Strauss'scher Walzer, opus 292. Johann Strauss himself reused the same melody as the main theme of his Jubilee Waltzes, written twenty-two years later, in 1872.
