= Im Krapfenwald'l =

Polka by Johann Strauss II

Im Krapfenwald'l (In Krapfen's Woods), Op. 336, is a polka by Johann Strauss II written in 1869 and was originally titled 'Im Pawlowsk Walde' (In the Pavlovsk Woods) when first performed in Pavlovsk on 6 September (= 25 August Russian calendar) 1869. Reportedly, several encores of the piece were called for and Strauss felt moved to retitled the piece to suit his audience back in native Vienna.

The new title 'Im Krapfenwald'l' alludes to the popular Krapfenwald area of the Wienerwald located in the scenic village of Grinzing and the heights of Cobenzl and Kahlenberg. The piece may also refer to the owner of the local tavern 'Krapfenwaldel', Franz Josef Krapf who opened his establishment at the same area. Eduard Strauss, who was responsible for performing many of his elder brother's works dating from his Russian tour first performed the work in Vienna at the Vienna Volksgarten on 24 June 1870 where it enjoyed greater admiration.

The work which hints strongly at the Viennese Woods backdrop calls for bird whistles which adorn the polka. Strauss has the last laugh when he calls for one of these birdsong in the closing moments of this cheerful work before a rushed ending with percussions and a flourish.
