= Phänomene =

Phänomene (Phenomena), opus 193, is a waltz composed by Johann Strauss II. The waltz was dedicated to the technical students of the Vienna University, and was first performed on the occasion of their ball in the Sofienbad-Saal in February 1857. This composition belongs to the series of Strauss waltzes which reflect the composer's fascination for avant-garde orchestrations and harmonic styles of Hector Berlioz and Richard Wagner.
