= Kaiser-Jubiläum-Jubelwalzer =

Kaiser-Jubiläum Jubelwalzer is a waltz composed by Johann Strauss II in 1888 to commemorate the fortieth anniversary of the accession to throne of his monarch, Emperor Franz Josef. The Emperor commissioned the waltz in order to celebrate the progress of Vienna and the prosperity of the Austro-Hungarian Monarchy.

The numerous celebrations planned were withheld out of respect of the death of the Emperor's father-in-law, although Strauss was permitted to proceed with the dedication. He conducted the Strauss Orchestra in the first performance of the waltz at the Musikverein where brother Eduard Strauss was having his own benefit concert at the same day of the official royal celebrations.
