= Hell und voll =

Hell und voll (Bright and Full), Op. 216, is a waltz composed by Johann Strauss II. The waltz was originally titled Hell und offen (Bright and Open), but this was later changed to Hell und voll. The work was first performed at a Medical Students' Ball at the Sofienbad-Saal in Vienna on 25 January 1859.
