= Demolirer-Polka =

1862 composition by Johann Strauss II

Demolirer-Polka (Demolition Men's Polka) Op. 269, is a polka-française written by Johann Strauss II in 1862. The title chronicled a significant milestone in the history of Vienna, where earlier on 20 December 1857, Austrian emperor Franz Josef decreed that the city limits of the capital be expanded to cater to the further needs of a blooming and prosperous city. This would include the demolition of the ancient bastions surrounding the old inner city by scores of demolition men recruited from the Habsburg crownlands of Bohemia, Moravia and Croatia. This project would incorporate many of Vienna's suburbs, and the medieval fortifications were replaced by the Vienna Ring Road with parks, gardens and many other structures of architectural grandeur.

This polka was first performed at a soirée in the Sperl ballroom alongside his waltz Karnevalsbotschafter, Op. 270, on 22 November 1862. The polka does not, however, suggest anything from its unconventional title although it never runs out of typical Strauss good-humor and gaiety.
