= Illustrationen =

Waltz by Johann Strauss II

Illustration (Illustrations) op. 331 is a waltz by Johann Strauss II composed in 1869. It was appropriately titled for the annual ball of the Vienna Journalists' and Authors' Association ('Concordia') that was held in the Sofienbad Saal on 26 January the same year.

Accordingly, the waltz was intended to instill the dancing mood for the many luminaries who graced the event like then Mayor of Vienna Cajetan Freiherr von Felder, the Director of Police, the Privy Councillor von Strobach and many other distinguished guests of the banking, diplomatic and political fields. Strauss' work belonged to the period of finest creativity with 'The Blue Danube' waltz op. 314 success behind him and with the Wein, Weib und Gesang waltz and the operetta Die Fledermaus still to come.

Strauss' waltz begins with attention-seeking chords on the strings which transcends into a quiet passage which gradually becomes louder and ushers in the first waltz section. The first waltz section comprises a hesitated tune with a snare drum accompaniment akin to the classic Viennese waltz variety. Later melodies are genial and relaxed, never too triumphant but the fifth waltz section is justifiably energetic. The coda recalls earlier melodies and the first waltz theme dances in again. After a short rephrase of the fifth waltz section, the piece accelerates to its triumphant close with a stylish flourish.
