= Studentenlust =

Studentenlust (Students' Joy) op. 285 is a waltz by Johann Strauss II composed in 1864. The waltz was written as a dedication piece for the Students' Ball held in the Redoutensaal of the Imperial Hofburg Palace on 31 January of that year.

The work features Ludwig Fischer's famous student song Im kühlen Keller sitz' ich hier in the Introduction and the coda section. Strauss' waltz brims with joy and demonstrates a creative period when he and his brothers Josef and Eduard were also on hand to dominate the musical scene in Vienna as this piece was intended for the 1864 Fasching.
