= Farewell to America =

Farewell to America (w/o op.) is the name of a waltz composed by Johann Strauss II. In the immediate wake of the composer's visit to the United States in the summer of 1872, when he conducted several times in Boston and New York, no less than seven publishers issued waltzes supposedly composed by Strauss. Only two from the total of nine compositions that were published are known to have been performed by Strauss during his tour of the United States: the Jubilee Waltz and the Manhattan Waltzes. It is unknown whether or not the other compositions that were published were written by Strauss while he was in America, completed by him after his return to Vienna and sent through the mail, or that some of the publications had nothing to do with Strauss himself, but were compiled by publishers anxious to benefit from Strauss' American tour and the clamour for new Strauss music.

Unlike its companion waltz, the Greeting to America, Farewell to America is a potpourri of melodies previously written by Johann Strauss, including:

- Introduction—Introduction to Karnevalsbotschafter op. 270
- Waltz 1A — theme 1A from Wiener Punschlieder op. 131
- Waltz 1B — theme 1B from Spiralen op. 209
- Waltz 2A — theme 2B from Gedankenflug op. 215
- Waltz 2B — theme 2B from Gedankenflug op. 215
- Waltz 3A — theme 1A from Controversen op. 191
- Waltz 3B — theme 4B from Controversen op. 191
- Waltz 4A — theme 5A from Promotionen op. 221
- Waltz 4B — theme 2B from Petitionen op. 153 (composed by Josef Strauss)
- Coda — 15 bars from Coda of Feuilleton op. 293

(The waltz also has a quotation from "The Star-Spangled Banner".)

The presence of a melody by Josef Strauss, found in Waltz 4B, suggests that Farewell to America was perhaps compiled not by Strauss himself, but by a house arranger for the publisher, Oliver Ditson.
