= Waldine =

Waldine, Op. 385, is a polka-mazurka composed by Johann Strauss II. The title is taken from one of Strauss' operettas, Blindekuh (Blind Man's Buff). Waldine was the last, as well as the least successful, of the five orchestral dance compositions that Strauss had arranged on tunes from the operetta, having been first performed an entire year after the premiere of the operetta, where it was conducted by Eduard Strauss in the Musikverein in Vienna on December 7, 1879.
