= Neu Wien =

Neu Wien (New Vienna), opus 342, is a waltz written by Johann Strauss II in 1870 and dedicated to Nicolaus Dumba (1830–1900), who was a fervent patron of Arts and was the Chairman of the Wiener Männergesang-Verein (Vienna's Men Choral Association) and vice-president of the Gesellschaft der Musikfreunde in Wien (Society of Friends of Music in Vienna).

New Vienna was written in the form of a choral waltz at the request of the Choral Association and was first performed at the Fasching of 1870 for the Association's 'Narrenabend' (Fool's Evening) where Strauss had similarly dedicated his waltz Wein, Weib und Gesang op. 333 for the same festivity. Strauss himself did not perform the choral work at its première on 13 February 1870 because of a commitment to the Prince Hohenlohe-Schillingsfürst to provide music for the latter's ball on exactly the same day as the Association's 'Narrenabend'. The new work was therefore entrusted to the musicians of the 49th (Baron Hess) Infantry Regiment under the direction of Eduard Kremser to provide its premiere.

Although the waltz was intended as a choral work with text by the Association's poet and good friend of Strauss Josef Weyl, today, the work is more familiar being a purely orchestral work as is the other Strauss waltzes which began life as a choral work such as The Blue Danube waltz. Weyl's text refers to the expansion of Vienna in 1870 where various old suburbs are incorporated as well.

The waltz also chronicled a sad chapter in the Strauss dynasty with the death of mother Anna Strauss after a long illness on 23 February 1870. Strauss and his brothers temporarily withdrew from the musical life before reappearing on 13 March of the same year at the Musikverein's Golden Hall with the Strauss Orchestra for the 'Carnival Revue'. Johann Strauss' new waltz in purely orchestral form met with generous applause when performed on that occasion and has since retained its popularity. Nicolaus Dumba himself remained proud of his dedication for the rest of his life and survived long enough to actually witness themes from the waltz incorporated into the operetta Wiener Blut five months after Strauss' death in 1899.
