= Bonbon =

Small chocolate confection

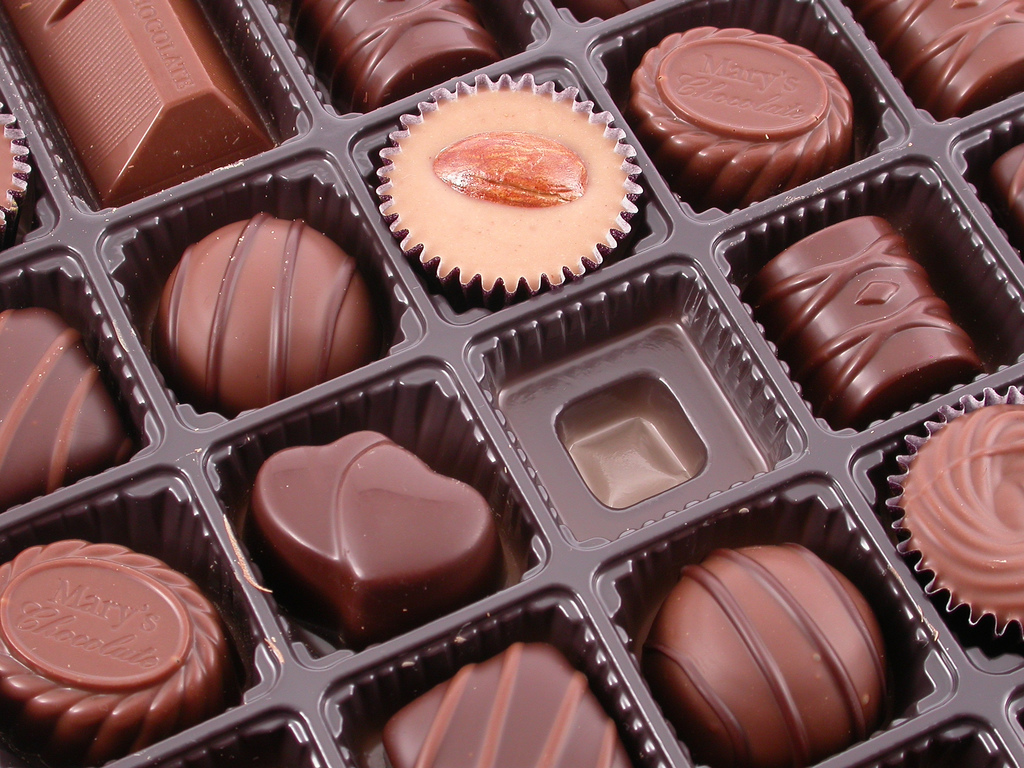
- Box of bonbons
- Alternative names: Bon-bon
- Type: Confectionery
- Place of origin: France

A bonbon, sometimes bon-bon, is a small chocolate confection. They are sometimes filled with liqueur or other sweet alcoholic drinks and sold wrapped in colored foil.

== Ingredients ==
Throughout the Western world, bonbons are usually small candies but vary by region in their ingredients, flavours, and shape. In France, bonbons have been made with a fruit centre, and may contain brittle, nougat, dragée, or caramel. Other possible fillings include butterscotch, fondant, fudge, ganache, gianduja, marzipan, praline, and truffle. Bonbons made with a fondant centre are specifically called chocolate creams.

According to French law, a bonbon de chocolat must be at least 25% chocolate and can come in several forms:

- a bite-sized chocolate
- a selection of different chocolates
- a mixture of chocolate and other edible ingredients

Specifically in the United States, "Bon Bon" is The Hershey Company's trademarked name for a frozen confection made from vanilla ice cream and covered in chocolate.

In the United Kingdom, a bonbon is a hard candy with a chewy centre and coated in icing sugar. British bonbons are available in flavours such as strawberry, lemon, blue raspberry, and toffee.

== Etymology and history ==
The word "bonbon" arose from the reduplication of the word bon, meaning "good" in the French language. Its use originated in the seventeenth century within the French royal court and spread to other European countries by the eighteenth century. Bonbons began to be served in ornate containers by the middle of the eighteenth century, which would be given as gifts at festivals and on holidays such as New Year's Day.

Johann Strauss II wrote the waltz Wiener Bonbons in 1866. The title page shows the composition's name in the form of twisted bonbon wrappers.

== See also ==
- Chocolate praline
