= Klangfiguren =

Klangfiguren (German for "sound figures"), Op. 251, is a waltz composed by Johann Strauss II. It was his dedication composition for the ball of the technical students of the Vienna University, which was held in Vienna's Sofienbad-Saal in February 1861.
