= Abschieds-Rufe =

Abschieds-Rufe (Cries of Farewell), op, 179, is a waltz composed by Johann Strauss II. It premiered in January 1856 at a ball attended by some two thousand guests in the Sofienbad-Saal in Vienna. The waltz was very well received, and was repeated four times.
