= Indigo-Marsch =

March by Johann Strauss II

Indigo-Marsch (Indigo March), opus 349, is a march composed by Johann Strauss II. Its melodies are incorporated from Strauss' first operetta, Indigo und die vierzig Räuber (Indigo and the Forty Thieves). The work was first performed on 9 April 1871 at a concert in the Musikverein in Vienna, with Eduard Strauss conducting.
