= Rathausball-Tänze =

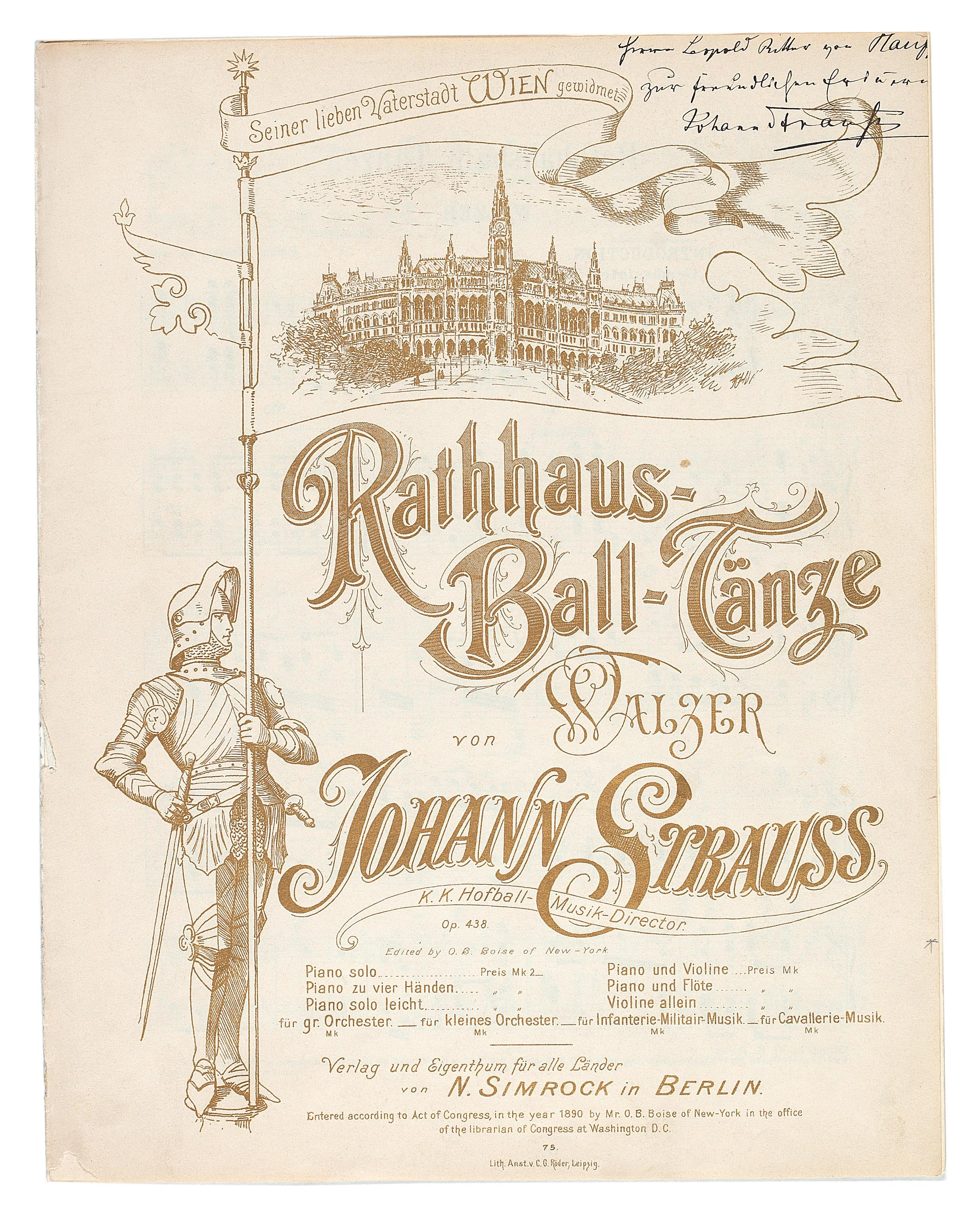

Rathausball-Tänze op. 438 is a waltz by composer Johann Strauss II written in 1890 in honour of the inauguration of the new city hall of Vienna (the 'Rathaus'). At the opening of the new banqueting hall (Festsaal) on 12 February 1890 two rival orchestras were commissioned to provide dance music for the occasion; the Strauss Orchestra under the direction of Eduard Strauss, and that of rival Kapellmeister Karl Michael Ziehrer who was head of the Vienna House Regiment 'Hoch und Deutschmeister No. 4'.

The waltz incorporates many snatches of The Blue Danube waltz op. 314; much of the coda is based on Haydn's Austrian hymn Gott erhalte Franz den Kaiser. As a consequence the coda is one of the first in a Strauss not to recall themes from earlier sections.

Ziehrer's waltz, the Wiener Bürger waltz op. 419 remained the more popular of the two works presented. This marked the first of the many occasions where after Johann Strauss II's death, his brother Eduard Strauss often found himself at rivalry with Ziehrer.

Johann Strauss was evidently bitter at his 'musical defeat'. In a letter to his publisher of the waltz, Fritz Simrock, in 1892 he pointed out an error in the score which he claimed 'spoiled the entire melody' and that the publisher had 'effectively mutilated him' before adding 'After that, am I supposed to say 'with best wishes'? Yes, I'll say it anyway!'.
