= Leichtes Blut =

Leichtes Blut (Light of Heart), Op. 319, is a polka composed by Johann Strauss II. It was first performed at a benefit concert at the Vienna Volksgarten in March 1867.
