= Figaro-Polka =

French polka written by Johann Strauss II

Figaro-Polka op. 320 is a French polka written by Johann Strauss II in 1867 and was dedicated to Hippolyte de Villemessant, who was the editor-in-chief of the Paris newspaper Le Figaro.

De Villemessant, the dedicatee of the 'Figaro-Polka', championed Strauss in his newspaper. Strauss acknowledged de Villemessant's role in his Paris success and therefore dedicated the new polka to the latter. Its premiere was on 30 July 1867 at the Cercle International building at the Paris International Exhibition with the orchestra of Benjamin Bilse.

The polka is in the 'French-polka' style. The piece begins with chords in F major, and proceeds at a relaxed pace, with a lively finale.
