= Carl August von Schmidt =

German geophysicist and meteorologist

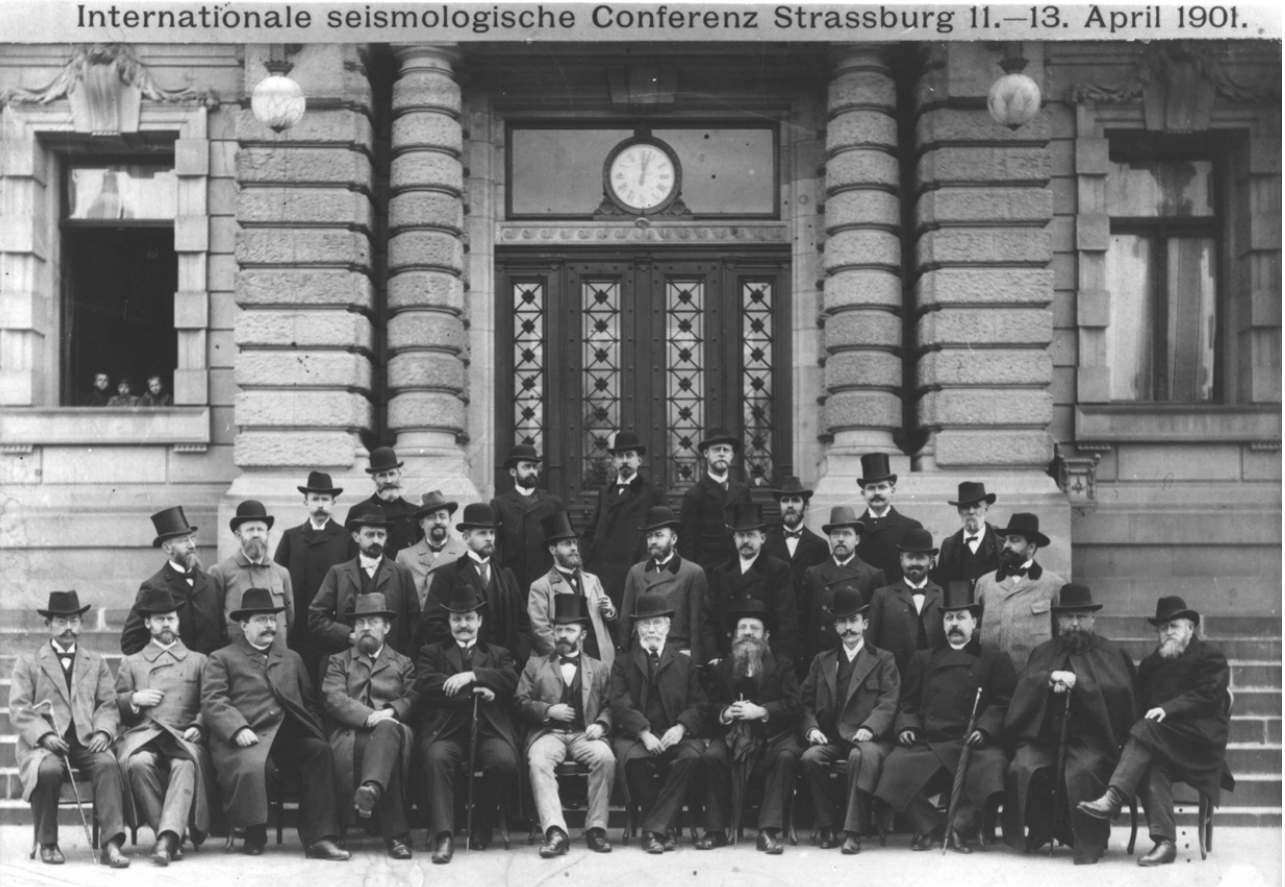
Schmidt (seated fourth from left) at the first seismological conference, Strassbourg, 1901

Carl August von Schmidt or August Schmidt (1 January 1840 – 21 March 1929) was a German geophysicist and meteorologist. He innovated seismographs and developed techniques based on plotting distance and time to demonstrate the refraction of seismic waves as they travelled through the earth.

Schmidt was born in Diefenbach, the son of a teacher. He was initially educated in theology in Tübingen, passing the Abitur exam in 1862. He then shifted to the study of mathematics and natural sciences, spending some time in Paris as a teacher. In 1872 he joined the Stuttgart Dillmann Realgymnasium as a teacher, working there until 1904. He also served at the Württemberg meteorological station from 1896 to 1912. From 1902 he was also associated with earthquake research at Strasbourg and from 1906 at Lake Constance. His work in meteorology was on understanding the decline in temperature of the air with altitude. In 1888 he demonstrated using time-distance plots (or hodographs), that earthquake waves did not move in straight lines. In 883 he developed a seismometer to measure movements in three horizontal directions and a vertical one and in 1900 he developed what he called a trifilar gravimeter for studying earthquakes, which was installed at Hohenheim near Stuttgart.
