= Grillenbanner =

Grillenbanner (Banisher of Gloom), opus 247, is a waltz composed by Johann Strauss II. Strauss himself conducted its premiere at a ball in the Sofienbad-Saal in February 1861. The work was dedicated to Prince Leopold of Saxe-Coburg-Gotha.
