= Novellen =

Waltz composed by Johann Strauss II

Novellen (Legal Amendments), opus 146, is a waltz composed by Johann Strauss II. The composition was dedicated to the law students of the Vienna University on the occasion of their ball held at the Sofienbad-Saal in Vienna on January 31, 1854. The work reflects Strauss's fascination for the 'revolutionary' orchestrations of Wagner and Meyerbeer. Due to this, the music critic Eduard Hanslick was highly critical of the waltz, saying that "with their lengthy eight-bar motifs, their groaning diminished seventh and ninth chords, [and] the thundering noise of their trombones and timpani, [they] are no longer appropriate for dancing.
