= Frohsinns-Spenden =

Frohsinns-Spenden (Gifts of Cheerfulness), opus 73, is a waltz composed by Johann Strauss II. The composition premiered in January 1850 in the Sofienbad-Saal, at a charity ball.
