= Waldmeister =

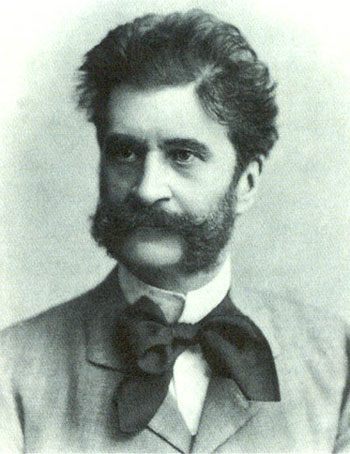
Johann Strauss II

Waldmeister (Woodruff) is an operetta written by Johann Strauss II to a libretto by Gustav Davis. It was first performed on 4 December 1895 at the Theater an der Wien. Although not as popular as some of Strauss' other operettas, such as Der Zigeunerbaron and Die Fledermaus, it was given eighty-eight performances, and was much admired by Johannes Brahms, a friend of the composer.

== Roles ==
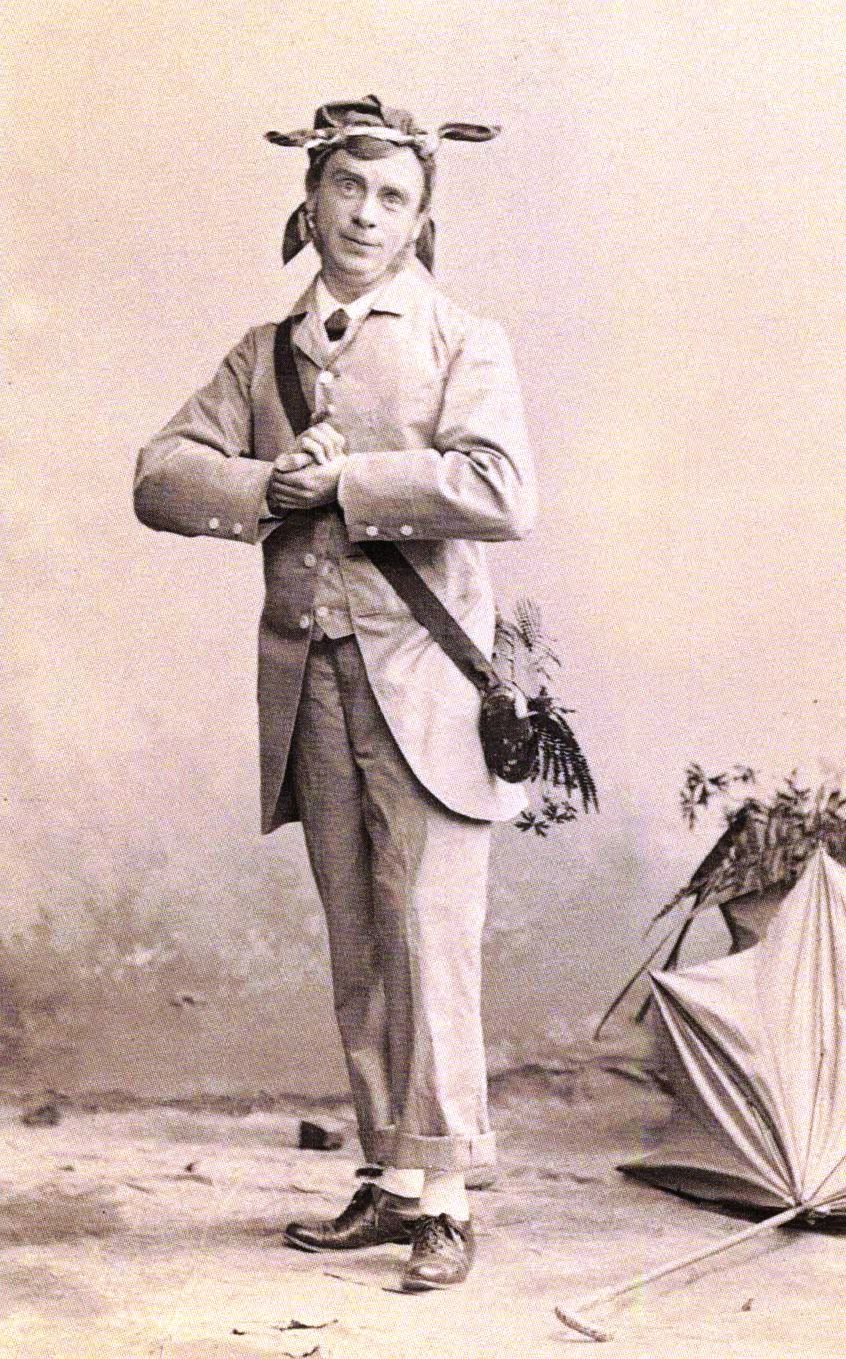
Carl Friese in a 1899 production

Roles, voice types, premiere cast
| Role | Voice type | Premiere cast, 4 December 1895 Conductor: Johann Strauss II |
|---|---|---|
| Christof Heffele, chief Amtmann | baritone | Ehrenfried Kernreuther |
| Malwine, his wife | contralto | Johanna Frey |
| Freda, their daughter | soprano | Julie Kopacsy-Karczag |
| Tymoleon von Gerius, forest intendant | tenor | Karl Streitmann |
| Pauline, singer from the Dresden Opera | soprano | Marie Ottmann |
| Erasmus Friedrich Müller, professor of botany | tenor | Alexander Girardi |
| Jeanne, friend of Pauline | soprano | Therese Biedermann |
| Botho von Wendt, young aristocrat | tenor | Josef Josephi |

== Synopsis ==
Overture

=== Act 1 ===
The inside of a mill in the forest

The apprentice foresters are on a hunting trip to the mill in the forest with the singer Pauline and her friends when they are surprised by the rain and get completely drenched. They are given dry clothes by the miller boys and maids of foreman Martin for a good price. Professor Müller, who is applying for a job at the forest academy and botanizing in the forest, is also driven into the mill by the rain. He meets the cute Jeanne, Pauline's travel companion, whom he likes and who, like everything that interests him, takes photographs of, because he always has his small photographic apparatus with him. He also is given dry clothes by Martin, namely the work clothes of the miller, who is in town and is only expected back in the evening. Gerius' strict master forester Tymoleon followed the apprentice foresters who undertook the trip without his permission and wants to surprise them here. Pauline, in the miller's dress, saves the apprentices by coquettishly captivating Tymoleon and tempting him to kiss her. Müller conscientiously takes photos of this, and the apprentices take the opportunity of making fun of their superior's kissing. Tymoleon is very embarrassed. He feels immoral because he fancies Freda, the daughter of the district captain Heffele, who is just as pretty as she is rich. He therefore turns a blind eye and talks with Professor Müller, whom he thinks to be the miller.

=== Act 2 ===
Scene 1: Veranda in the Pauline's country house

Mayor Heffele and City Mayor Danner come to Pauline to tell her that she and her friend are free to leave because their cleavage-revealing clothes cannot be tolerated in their moral city. Although they smile at the singer in her light tennis costume, they still threaten to arrest her if she continues. Pauline joins forces with the apprentice foresters, who are invited to the office of the captain to betray Tymoleon to Freda in the evening.

Scene 2: Salon at Heffele's

Heffele finds a bush of woodruff coloured black by ink, and believes to have discovered a new species, black woodruff. That is why he invited the botanist Professor Müller in the first place, to confirm his discovery. Müller discovers the servant Sebastian painting new woodruff with ink, but promises to remain silent, and Heffele relieves him of the agony of having to drink linden blossom tea, which Ms. Heffele offers all guests as the healthiest drink. A large bowl is already ready. But Heffele shows the professor where he hid his Moselle wine. – The engagement to Tymoleon is not to Freda's taste. She loves the apprentice forester Botho von Wendt. Botho has appeared with his friends, hands over a bunch of woodruff to everyone, and manages to talk to Freda, to assure them of their love. Tymoleon wants to object, but Pauline, who appears in the miller's clothes, is there first. She throws herself around Tymoleon's neck and explains that the miller sent her away because she kissed the master forester. Now she would like to get a divorce and marry Tymoleon. This is the greatest embarrassment and forces the professor to introduce Pauline as his wife. With the help of the apprentices, Müller pours out the linden blossom tea and brews a punch bowl from Heffele's Moselle wine and Freda's woodruff's bouquet. Malwine offers her guests her healing tea, they drink, and the May wine does its job. You drink a little and your senses start to get confused; and so Tymoleon gets around a discovery because he doesn't notice that he's led by Pauline and the apprentices.

=== Act 3 ===
Garden room in Heffele's house

The next morning everything is in a good mood. Tymoleon is happy that the professor is not the miller, he is happy that Pauline is not the miller, but the well-known singer. He gives Müller the job, says goodbye to Freda because she loves Botho, and will start courting Pauline, who has recently flirted with him. Müller fancies Jeanne, and Mr. and Mrs. Heffele give their daughter Freda to Botho in view of Tymoleon's resignation. Since Ms. Heffele has doubts about her invention, the professor shows her the picture he took the day before. The black was ink. There is no black woodruff. And linden blossom tea usually has a different effect than the previous night. The potion was made from woodruff!

The world premiere recording was released by the classical label Naxos in 2021 on a double CD (8.660489-90) with the Sofia Philharmonic Chorus and Orchestra conducted by Dario Salvi, with an international cast of singers.

== See also ==
Works based on Waldmeister:

- "Trau, schau, wem!", Op. 463 – waltz
- "Herrjemineh", Op. 464 – polka-française
- "Liebe und Ehe", Op. 465 – polka-mazurka
- "Klipp-Klapp-Galopp", Op. 466 – Schnellpolka
- "Es war so wunderschön", Op. 467 – march
- "Waldmeister-Quadrille", Op. 468 – quadrille
