= Nordseebilder =

- by Johann Strauss II
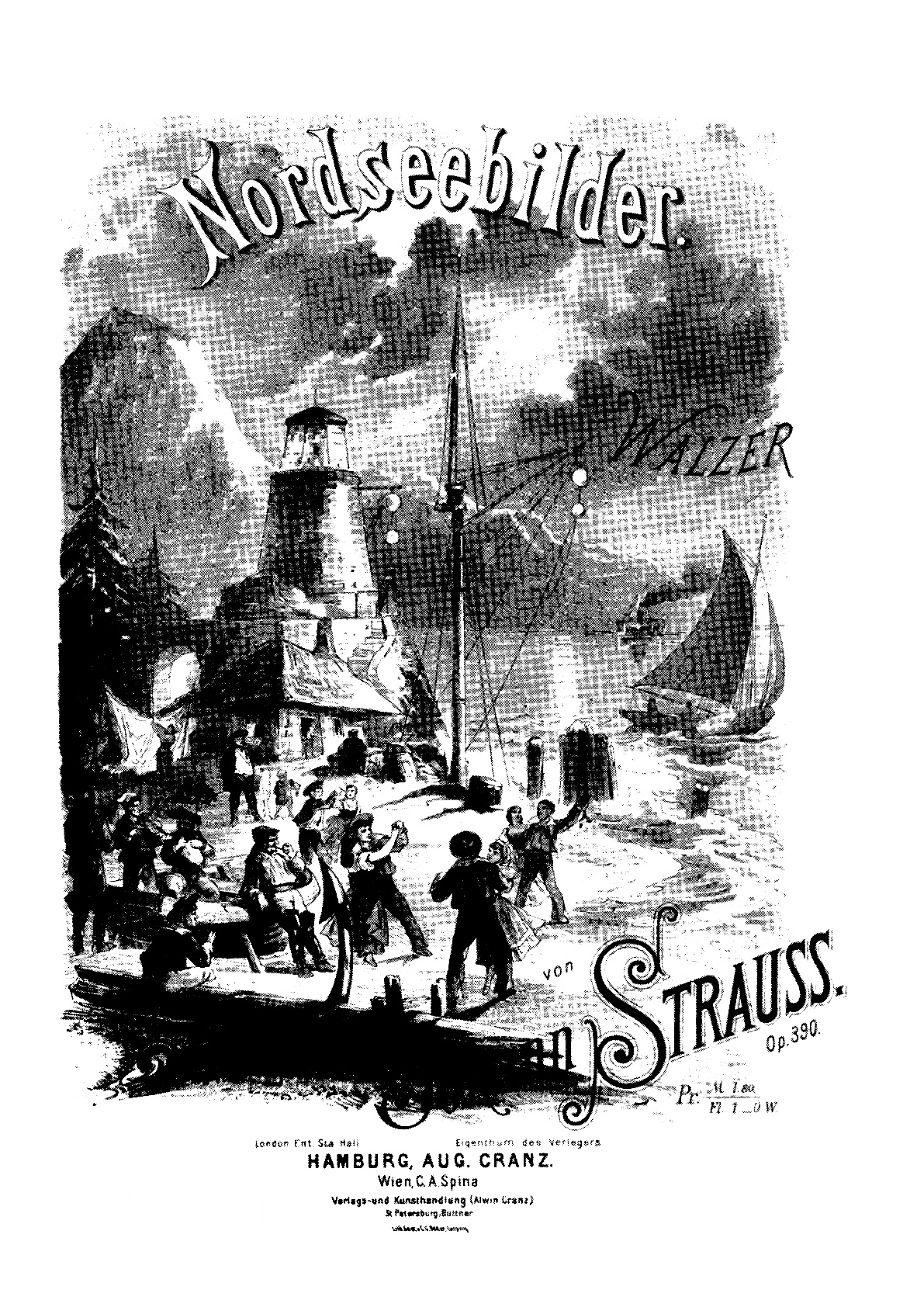
- Cover of the piano score (Published by August Cranz)
- Opus: 390
- Form: Waltz

Nordseebilder (North Sea Pictures) op. 390 is a waltz by Johann Strauss II composed in 1879.

This seascape waltz composition resulted from Strauss' visit to the North Frisian island of Föhr, when he and his second wife Angelika stayed in the town of Wyk during one of the holidays. The contrasting moods offered from living so close to the North Sea immediately galvanised Strauss' creative spirit which produced this mature work, capturing the sea storms as well as the strong gale all in 3/4 time.

Strauss' audiences in Vienna first heard the work when his brother Eduard Strauss conducted it at one of his concerts in the Musikverein on 16 November 1879. The waltz's slow introduction suggests a calm sea scene, while swirling waves are captured in later themes. The coda incorporates the 'sea storm' scene, with furious chords and fierce brass instruments suggesting the North Sea at the time of a severe gale. The first waltz theme is re-introduced before the work ends in a brilliant finish.

Waltz 1
