= Wiener Frauen =

1886 waltz by Johann Strauss II, Op. 423

Wiener Frauen or 'Viennese Ladies' op. 423 is a waltz composed by Johann Strauss II in 1886.

The waltz was originally titled 'Les dames de St. Peterburgh' when Strauss was invited by the 'Russian Red Cross Society' to conduct in St. Petersburg in that year.

Strauss first performed the piece at the riding school of the Horse Guards Regiment in that city to great acclaim and was thoughtful enough to re-christen the waltz 'Wiener Frauen' in a homage to his Viennese admirers when he had it performed in Vienna later that year.

The piece was among Strauss's last great waltzes and it brims with youthful vigour yet with hints of pensiveness and poignant moments as was common among his last works. The waltz was also first performed with its lesser-known 'sister work' Adele-Walzer op. 424 in the same hall and was dedicated to the composer's third wife Adele Strauss.
