= August Schmidt (journalist) =

Austrian music writer and musician

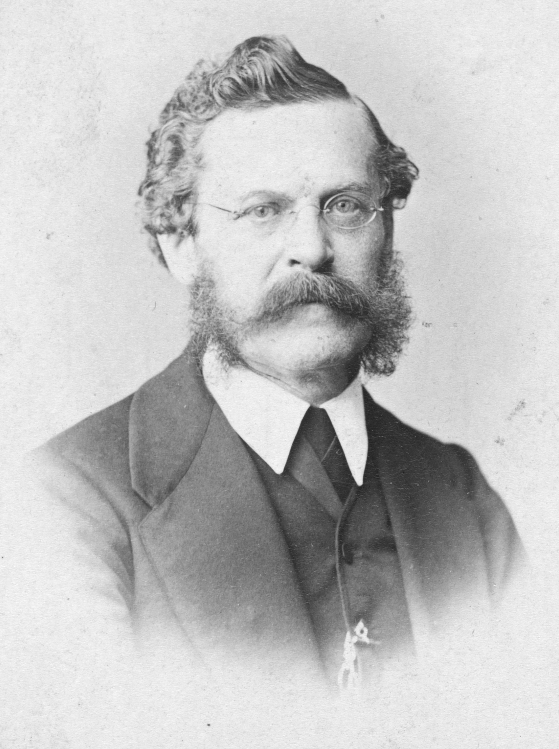
August Schmidt, photography of the Dr. Székely & Massak studio

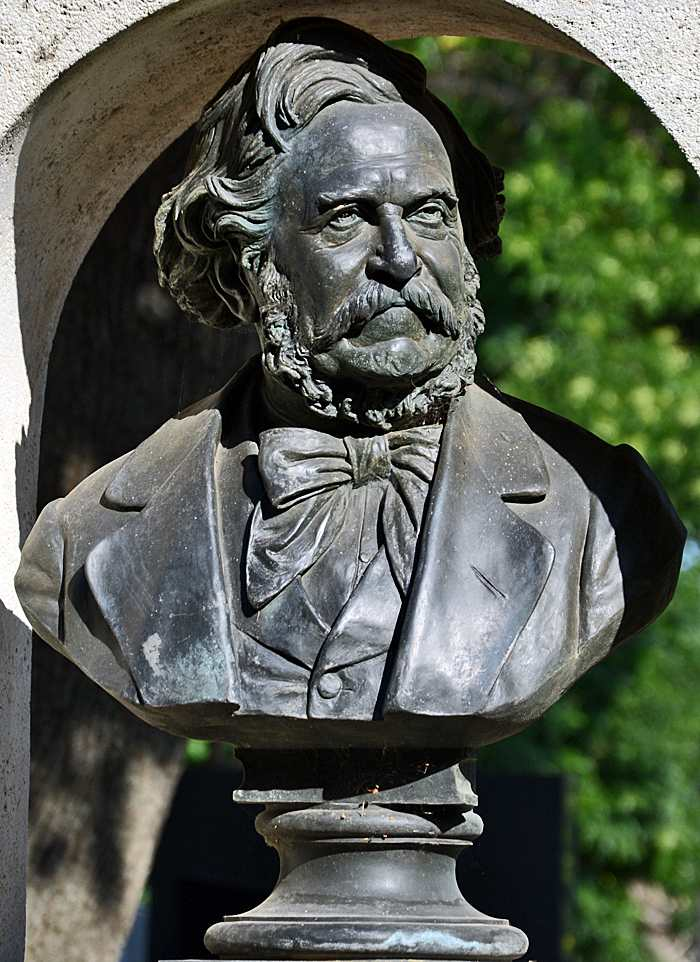
Bust of August Schmidt on his grave at Vienna Central Cemetery

August Schmidt (9 September 1808 – 13 October 1891) was an Austrian music writer, journalist, association organizer and musician.

== Life ==
=== Education and career ===
Born in Vienna, August Schmidt, son of the musician as well as civil servant Adam August Schmidt (1777-1847), took the school-leaving examination at the Viennese Bundesgymnasium Wien 8 in 1824. Schmidt, who had already received violin lessons from his father at the age of five, was subsequently trained as a singer by Johann Baptist Henneberg and Ludwig Schwarzböck. In 1828 he began his military service, and in 1834 he was transferred to the national debt register in the position of a cash officer. After he had been promoted there, he retired in 1870.

=== Activities ===
The active musician and composer of Liedern, Waltzs and concert pieces for violin made a name for himself as a music writer, journalist and organiser of associations. August Schmidt played a leading role in the founding of the Vienna Philharmonic. (1842), of the Wiener Männergesang-Verein (1843) and the mixed choir association Wiener Singakademie (1858). Schmidt, who had been publishing poems, stories and travelogues in newspapers and magazines since 1836, founded the "Allgemeine Wiener Musikzeitung" in 1841, which was influential in the development of Viennese musical life, and he was its publisher and editor until 1847. Afterwards he was correspondent of the Süddeutsche Musik-Zeitung from 1852 to 1854 and from 1856 to 1872 music advisor of the Wanderer.

Schmidt published, among other things, his music biographical compilation Denksteine in 1848, Geschichte des Wiener Männergesang-Vereins in 1860 and Monographie des Madrigals in 1890.

His grave is located at the Vienna Central Cemetery.

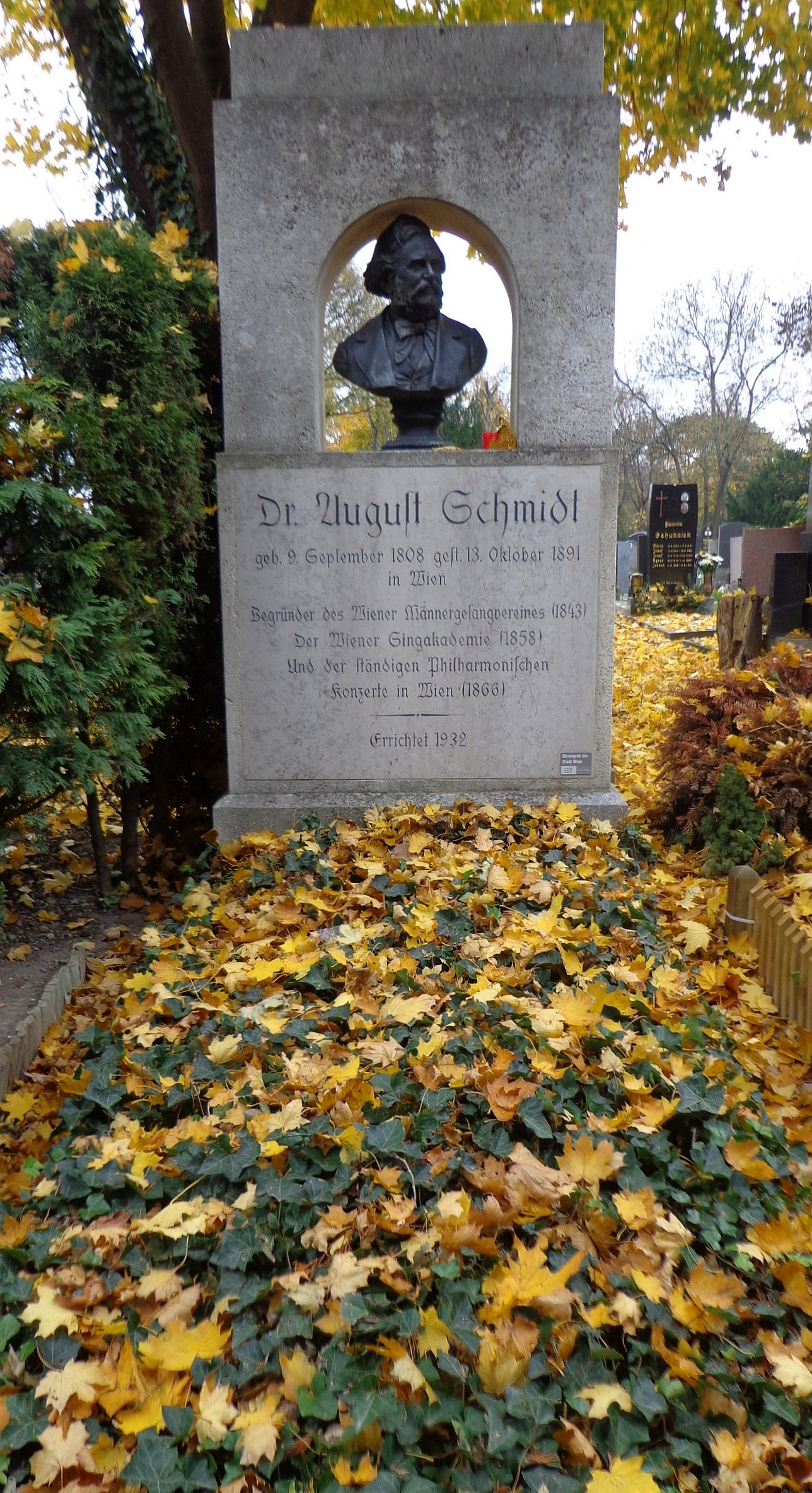
August Schmidt's grave site

== Honors ==
In 1839 the philosophical faculty of the Friedrich-Schiller-Universität Jena awarded Schmidt an honorary doctorate (Dr. phil.) in recognition of his services. On 24 February 1840, the same university also awarded Robert Schumann this title.

== Work ==
- Orpheus. Musikalisches Album, Vienna: Volke 1840–1842 (Orpheus : musikalisches Album on Heinrich Heine Universität)
- Denksteine. Biographien, Vienna 1848 (Numerized)
- Der Wiener Männergesang-Verein. Geschichtliche Darstellung seines Entstehens und Wirkens zur Feier seines fünfundzwanzigjährigen Jubiläums, Vienna 1868 (Numerized)

== Bibliography ==
- Constantin von Wurzbach: August. In the Biographisches Lexikon des Kaiserthums Oesterreich, 30th part. Kaiserlich-königliche Hof- und Staatsdruckerei, Vienna 1875, pp. 219–228
- S. Eschwé, H. Reitterer: "Schmidt, August". In: Österreichisches Biographisches Lexikon 1815–1950 (ÖBL). Vol. 10, Austrian Academy of Sciences, Vienna 1994, ISBN 3-7001-2186-5, p. 246 f. (Direct links to "p. 246", "p. 247")
- Walther Killy and Rudolf Vierhaus (ed.): Deutsche Biographische Enzyklopädie. vol. 9, K.G. Saur Verlag GmbH & Co. KG, Munich, 1996 ISBN 3-598-23163-6, p. 3
