= Klange aus der Walachei =

Klänge aus der Walachei (Echoes from Wallachia), opus 50, is a waltz composed by Johann Strauss II. The composition was first performed on 6 January 1848 in Bucharest in Wallachia (now Romania), as part of a six-month tour of Europe that Strauss was conducting with his orchestra. Strauss had been influenced by the folk music of the countries he had toured, and this is reflected in his waltz Klänge aus der Walachei.
