= Du und du =

Du und Du (You and You), opus 367, is a waltz by Johann Strauss II composed in 1874. It derives from themes from his Die Fledermaus, the famous operetta, and its title and opening melody specifically from the Du-i-Du chorus of Brüderlein, Brüderlein und Schwesterlein in Act II.
