= Carnevalsbilder =

1873 waltz composed by Johann Strauss II

Carnevalsbilder (Carnival Pictures), opus 357, is a waltz composed by Johann Strauss II. The waltz is based on melodies from Strauss' operetta Der Karneval in Rom. Strauss conducted its first performance in Vienna on 9 July 1873. Oscar Straus later arranged the second waltz theme of Carnevalsbilder for his operetta Drei Walzer (Three Waltzes) as the soprano aria "Ich liebe das Leben" (better known in its French version, "Je t'aime)".
