= Postillon d'amour =

Postillon d'amour (Love's Messenger), Op. 317, is a polka-française composed by Johann Strauss II. It was written for the 1867 Vienna Carnival. The opening melodies of the work were used in Act One of the stage work Wiener Blut (Viennese Blood).
