= Phönix-Schwingen =

Phönix-Schwingen (Phoenix's Wings) op. 125 is a waltz composed by Johann Strauss II in 1853. Strauss has amalgamated his late father's orchestra with his own in 1849 and with the new responsibility, was expected to rehearse, organise, compose, orchestrate, and lastly, conduct at two or three venues on the same day. During the hectic years of 1851 and 1852, Strauss exerted himself and after a tiring tour of Germany late 1852, he was taken seriously ill.

Many of his engagements were forced to be cancelled although Strauss felt sufficiently well to appear at his benefit concert at the Sofienbad-Saal ballroom on January 16, 1853 along with his new waltz 'Phönix-Schwingen'. The title suggested a possible reference to himself, having like the mythical bird, 'risen from the ashes'. However, Strauss' interesting title may well refer to the unpopular Vienna transport enterprise 'Phoenix' which had promised faster and cheaper travel intending to rival the traditional Viennese 'fiaker'. The enterprise proved to be no more than a flash in the pan and foundered after a mere few days.

Whether meaning the mythical creature or the enterprise, Strauss' work is very brisk and stylish, with rising arpeggios and effective motif usage. The work was dedicated to Hans Guido von Bülow.
