= Wo die Zitronen blühen =

Waltz by Johann Strauss II

French piano score. It says "Bella Italia (Wo die Citronen blüh'n)"

Sung by the Vienna Boys' Choir

"Wo die Zitronen blühen" (German pronunciation: [ˈvoː diː tsiˈtʁoːnən ˈblyːən]; "Where the Lemons Blossom", or "Where the Citrons Bloom"), Op. 364, is a waltz by Johann Strauss II written in 1874. The waltz was composed during a tour of the composer in Italy where he travelled with the Langenbach Orchestra of Germany and performed the work at the Teatro Regio in Turin on 9 May 1874.

The waltz came after a successful premiere of his famous operetta Die Fledermaus and Strauss originally entitled the waltz as "Bella Italia" (Beautiful Italy) for his Italian audiences before renaming it "Wo die Zitronen blühen" after a quote from Johann Wolfgang von Goethe's novel Wilhelm Meisters Lehrjahre – "Kennst du das Land, wo die Zitronen blühn?" (Do you know the land where the lemons blossom?).

Strauss's waltz (as most of his waltzes dating from around this time) follows the structure of an introduction followed by three two-part waltz sections and a coda, instead of his earlier format of five two-part sections. This structure was to feature in most of his later waltzes although he did not set it as a definite and permanent structure.

Waltz 1

The work begins in a tranquil fashion in G major, with a reflective solo violin melody in the introduction. A series of loud chords precedes the gentle first waltz section. The second section is more animated with a second part in D major. The wistful nature of the waltz is further expanded in the third section. A lively coda reprises the second waltz section and the first waltz section makes another entry. As the waltz gets closer to the end, the solo violin makes another appearance and plays its earlier melody from the introduction before the waltz rises to a forte and climaxes with a timpani drumroll and blazing flourish in the brass instruments.

== Vienna New Year's Concert ==
The waltz was part of the Vienna New Year's Concert programmes as follows.

- 1951 – Clemens Krauss
- 1960 – Willi Boskovsky
- 1965 – Willi Boskovsky
- 1972 – Willi Boskovsky
- 1983 – Lorin Maazel
- 1988 – Claudio Abbado
- 1993 – Riccardo Muti
- 2007 – Zubin Mehta
- 2013 – Franz Welser-Möst
- 2020 – Andris Nelsons
