= Leitartikel =

Leitartikel (Leading Article) op. 273 is a waltz composed by Johann Strauss II in 1863 and first performed at the Vienna's Artists and Journalists' Association ball called 'Concordia', which glorifies the Roman goddess of civic harmony, on 19 January 1863. Theoretically, this work would have been Strauss' only contribution towards the festivity of Vienna's Fasching of that year as his health did not permit laborious hours of conducting nor of composing.

This work, which is the first of his many dance pieces to bear his august title of KK Hofballmusikdirektor, brims with enthusiasm which was rarely heard in many of his later waltzes which are more plaintive and reflective in nature. A tense Introduction slowly gives way to a more light-hearted opening 1st waltz section. The 2nd waltz section is less joyful although the cheekiness is not absent. A more robust 3rd section is punctuated by loud chords whereas the graceful 4th section contains some of Strauss' more lyrical melodies. The effervescent 5th waltz section carries on the irresistible genial character of the waltz while the coda recalls earlier material. A loud passage brings in the familiar 1st waltz theme again before the waltz rushes headlong into its brilliant and exciting close.
