= Lob der Frauen =

1867 polka-mazurka composed by Johann Strauss II

Lob der Frauen (Praise of Women), Op. 315, is a polka-mazurka composed by Johann Strauss II. The composition was first performed at the Vienna Volksgarten at the 1867 Carnival in Vienna. The work was performed alongside other compositions that Strauss had written around that period, including the famous waltzes Blue Danube and Artist's Life.
