= Rhadamantus-Klänge =

Rhadamantus-Klänge (Echoes of Rhadamantus), Op. 94, is a waltz composed by Johann Strauss II. It was written for the 1851 Vienna Carnival. The title of the work was named after Rhadamanthus, one of the judges of the underworld in Greek mythology. Eduard Strauss, the composer's youngest brother, included the waltz's opening number in his potpourri Bluthenkranz Johann Strauss'scher Walzer (Garland of Strauss Waltzes), opus 292.
