= Aus den Bergen =

Waltz composed by Johann Strauss II

Aus den Bergen (From the Mountains), opus 292, is the name of a waltz composed by Johann Strauss II. The work was first performed in Pavlovsk on October 2, 1864, under the title In den Bergen. The composition was dedicated to the music critic Eduard Hanslick. Critics commented on Strauss' waltz that "after a long time a new waltz from Johann Strauss has appeared, which is distinguished by noble and graceful character, and further distinguished by extraordinarily masterful instrumentation." The first Viennese performance of the waltz was in the Volksgarten as part of a benefit concert commemorating Strauss' twentieth anniversary of his debut as a composer.
