= Wiener Männergesang-Verein =

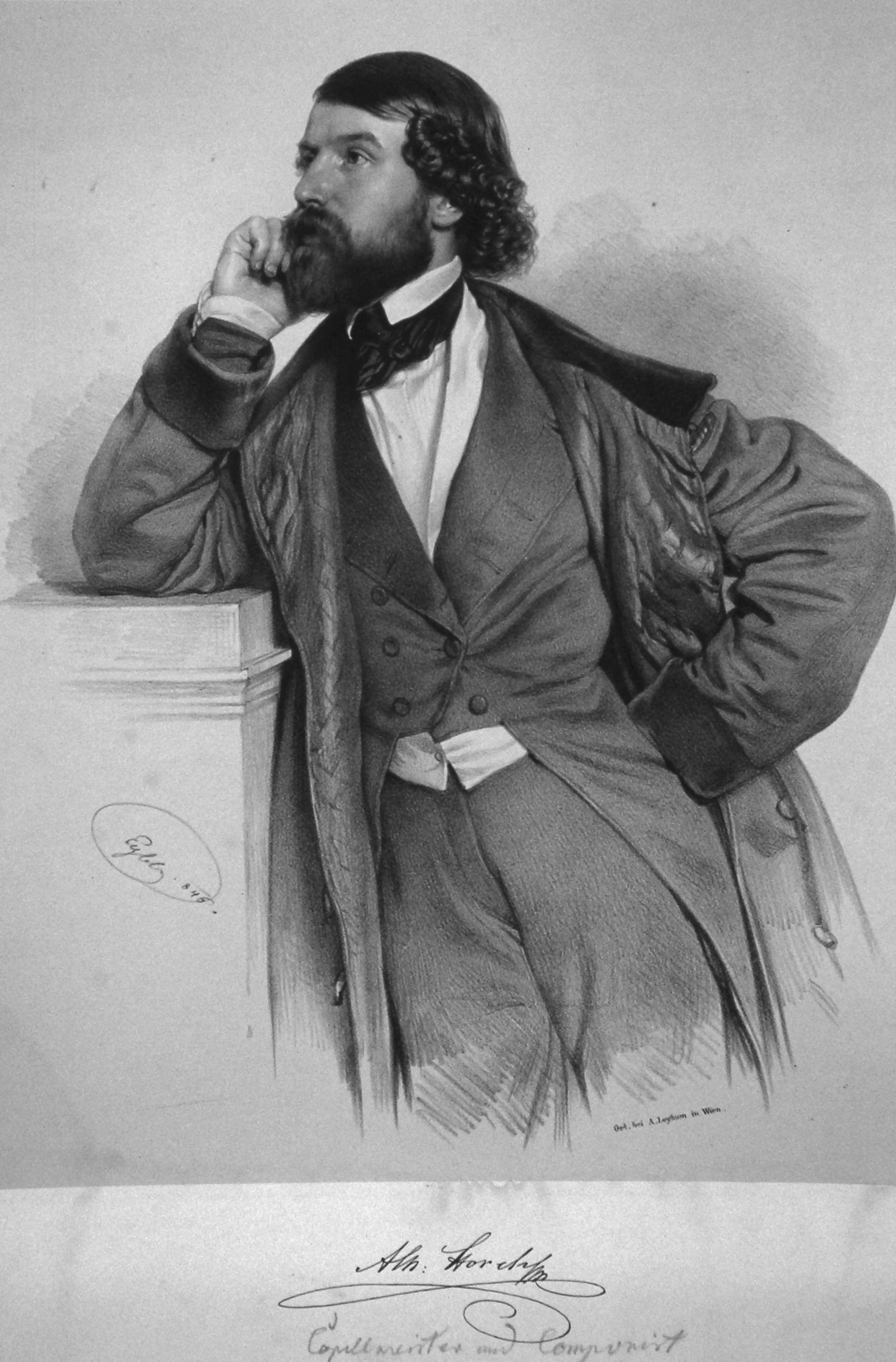
Anton M. Storch, musical director of the choir 1843–1851

The Wiener Männergesang-Verein ("Vienna Men's Choral Society" or "Vienna Male Voice Choir") is a men's choir in Vienna, Austria, founded in 1843. The choir has regularly appeared with the Vienna Philharmonic, and has performed worldwide. Notable composers, particularly Johann Strauss II, have composed music for the choir.

== History ==
The choir was founded by August Schmidt, on 6 October 1843 in the inn "Zum goldenen Löwen" ("The Golden Lion"). He was a journalist and founder of the Allgemeine Wiener Musik-Zeitung. The choir's first concert took place on 17 December of that year.

The first concert tour was to Würzburg in 1845, further tours in Europe followed. In 1849 the first annual concert with the Vienna Philharmonic took place. From 1872, concerts were held in the Großer Musikvereinssaal (Great Hall) of the Musikverein, opened in 1870.

"The Blue Danube", originally for men's choir and orchestra, was written by Johann Strauss II for the choir and was first performed on 15 February 1867. Strauss wrote further pieces for the choir, including Wein, Weib und Gesang and Neu Wien.

The choir placed stone tablets on Schubert's birthplace and on the house where he died, in 1858 and 1869 respectively. In 1862 the choir set up a fund to erect a statue of Franz Schubert in Vienna; the Schubert Monument, created by the sculptor Carl Kundmann, was unveiled in the Stadtpark on 15 May 1872.

In 1893, to celebrate 50 years since its founding, the choir performed Helgoland, a cantata written by Anton Bruckner for the occasion.

=== Twentieth century ===
The choir travelled to Egypt in 1905, the first of several trips outside Europe; in 1991 it travelled to the far east for the first time, to Japan, Taiwan and Hong Kong. In 1958 the choir performed at Expo 58 in Brussels with the Vienna Philharmonic, conducted by Herbert von Karajan.

A notable event between the two world wars was the 10th German Singers' Festival, organised in 1928 in Vienna by the choir. There were about 9000 choral societies and 140,000 singers.

In 1914 the choir gave its 1000th public concert; in 1929 the 1500th concert took place, at the Vienna State Opera; in 1954 it gave its 2000th public concert. In 1975 the choir appeared with the Vienna Philharmonic at the Vienna New Year's Concert.

== Repertoire ==
The repertoire extends from the Baroque period to the present day. The focus is on music for men's choir of the Romantic period, the Viennese Biedermeier and the world of opera. There may be piano or orchestral accompaniment, and soloists may take part.

== Museum ==
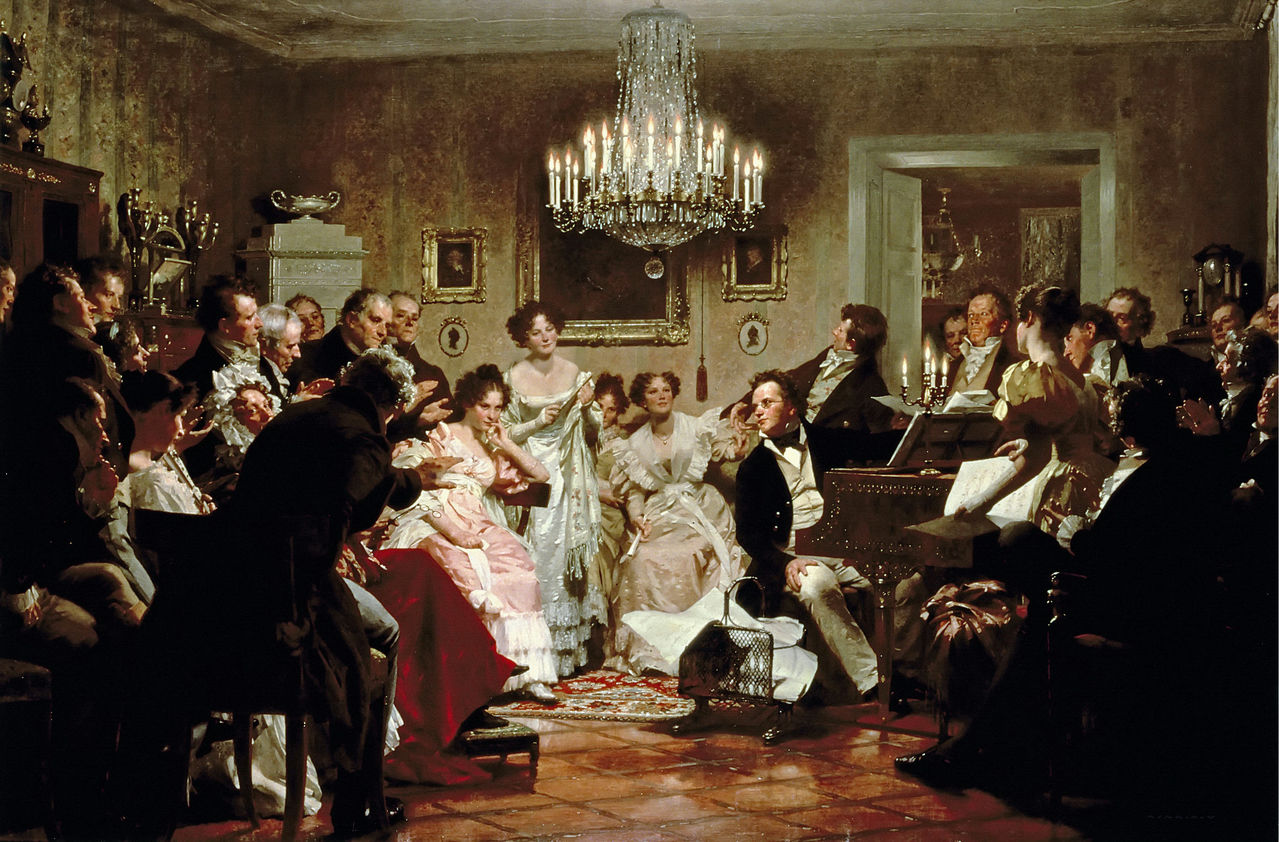
Schubertiade, by Julius Schmid, in the museum's collection

The choir has a museum in the Musikverein building. The collection of music manuscripts includes the original manuscripts of compositions by Johann Strauss II, Richard Wagner, Anton Bruckner and others which were dedicated to the choir, in particular the manuscript of Strauss's "The Blue Danube". There are letters and memorabilia relating to various events. There are paintings by Julius Schmid and Christian Attersee, and a banner designed by Theophil Hansen, a gift from Emperor Franz Joseph I in 1861. Items from the collection are sometimes loaned to exhibitions for special occasions. Tours of the museum can be made on request.

== Musical directors ==
The following are among the musical directors of the choir:

- Anton M. Storch (1843–1851)
- Gustav Barth (1843–1854)
- Ferdinand Stegmayer (1854–1856)
- Hans Schläger (1854–1861)
- Johann von Herbeck (1856–1866)
- Franz Mair (1861–1862)
- Eduard Kremser (1869–1910)
- Richard Heuberger (1902–1909)
- Viktor Keldorfer (1910–1921)
- Karl Luze (1913–1934)
- Ferdinand Grossmann (1927–1953)
- Karl Etti (1948–1973)
- Norbert Balatsch (1953–1975)
- Hermann Furthmoser (1973–1976)
- Franz Xaver Meyer (1976–1987)
- Gerhard Track (1990–2003)
- Antal Barnás (from 2005)
