= Vom Donaustrande =

Vom Donaustrande (By the Shores of the Danube, op. 356) is a polka by Johann Strauss II written in 1873. Its themes are drawn from his successful operetta, Der Karneval in Rom which premiered in Vienna's Theater an der Wien on 1 March 1873.

The themes from the operetta where the polka presents itself is under Acts 2 and 3. The quick tempo of the polka is the marking of the popular "schnell-polka", which was another form of polka in quick steps as different from the polka-mazurka and the French polka.
