= Freikugeln =

Freikugeln (Magic Bullets or Free-Shooter), opus 326, is a polka composed by Johann Strauss II. The composition commemorated the 3rd German Federal Shooting Contest, which attracted no less than ten thousand entrants from around the world. The work was first performed in July 1868 at the Vienna Volksgarten.
