= Dividenden =

Dividenden (Dividends), opus 252, is a waltz composed by Johann Strauss II. Strauss wrote the waltz for the first ball of the Industrial Societies, held in January 1861 in the Dianabad-Saal. It was the earliest of his compositions to receive its premiere in the renovated establishment.
