= Accelerationen =

1860 waltz composed by Johann Strauss II

Accelerationen (Accelerations), op. 234, is a waltz composed by Johann Strauss II in 1860 for the Engineering Students' Ball at the Sofienbad-Saal in Vienna. It is one of his best-known waltzes, famous especially for its rapidly accelerating opening waltz theme.

Accelerations is featured in Erich Wolfgang Korngold's The Tales of Strauss, Op. 21 as well as many of Strauss's other well-known waltzes.
