= 'S gibt nur a Kaiserstadt, 's gibt nur a Wien! =

1864 polka by Johann Strauss II

's gibt nur a Kaiserstadt, 's gibt nur a Wien! is a polka written by Johann Strauss II in 1864. The title of this polka was inspired from the waltz duet in the Singspiel (musical comedy) Aline by Adolf Bäuerle with music by Wenzel Müller first performed at the Theater in der Leopoldstadt on 9 October 1822. The song titled "Was macht denn der Prater" was a hit during its day whereas its refrain Ja nur ein' Kaiserstadt, ja nur a Wien (Yes, only one Imperial City, yes only one Vienna!) became a popular household phrase.

While Stauss adapts no music from the stage work, he did incorporate Haydn's Austrian Hymn "Gott erhalte Franz den Kaiser" into the finale of the polka. Strauss first performed the work during a lucrative Russian tour at Pavlovsk where he frequently performed at the Vauxhall Pavilion. At his penultimate concert there on 8 October 1864 (Russian calendar 26 September), he performed the work under its original title "Vergiß mein nicht" (Forget Me Not). For his audiences back home in Vienna, he retitled the work and performed it on 4 December 1864 at a festive concert at the Vienna Volksgarten to celebrate his 20th anniversary of his public début at Dommayer's Casino.
