= Die Bajadere (polka) =

"Die Bajadere" is one of Johann Strauss II's polkas, Op. 351. A bajadere was a temple dancer in the European vision of legendary India being popularized by the first translations of Indian classic literature into European languages. The European view melded all the world east of Suez into an exotic locale. The themes of "Die Bajadere" were drawn from the score of Strauss's first operetta, Indigo und die vierzig Räuber ("Indigo and the Forty Thieves"), loosely based on the Arabian Nights, which premiered in 1871 at the Theater an der Wien in Vienna.

'Die Bajadere' begins in the key of A major and has two complete sections in the same key before a brief Intrada heralds the Trio section of the work. The Trio section, in D major is heavily accented in the 1st part but is more lyrical in the second. After a general repeat of the same A major 1st part and its successive 2nd one, the polka proceeds into a frenzy, heavily-chorded phrase with an abrupt conclusion, all in the home key.

The work has been performed at multiple editions of the Neujahrskonzert of the Vienna Philharmonic Orchestra: first time being the 1997 edition conducted by Riccardo Muti and another instance being the first encore of the 2025 edition conducted by Riccardo Muti.

Marius Petipa's ballet La Bayadère premiered at the Mariinsky Theatre, Saint Petersburg, February 4, 1877.
