= Sträußchen =

Waltz composed by Johann Strauss II

Sträußchen (Bouquets), op. 15, is a waltz composed by Johann Strauss II in July 1845. It was first performed at the first ball held in the newly renovated 'Zum goldenen Strauss' ballroom in the buildings of the Theater in der Josefstadt in Vienna.
