= Bürgersinn =

Bürgersinn (Citizen Spirit) op. 295 is a waltz by Johann Strauss II composed in 1865 for the Citizen's Ball held during the Vienna Carnival Fasching of the year. His prestigious post of the 'KK Hofballmusikdirektor', which he attained in 1863, meant that his responsibilities included composing dance music for these functions.

This annual Citizen's Ball was held every year, especially for the middle-class as Emperor Franz Josef permitted the traditional ball to be held in the festive hall of the Habsburg's winter residence. Strauss first performed the work at the Redoutensaal of the Imperial Hofburg dedicated to the 'Gentlemen Committee of the Members of the Citizen's Ball' on 7 February 1865.

The work belongs to a period where Strauss' waltzes were in a period of interesting development, both structurally as well as musically. The citizen spirit was vividly invoked with its Viennese light-heartedness, but more so with its gentle pastoral Introduction where anticipation of an exciting waltz was at hand. Even the first theme of the waltz was quintessentially Viennese with its chorded melody. Other tunes were graceful and lyrical (sections 2 and 3) whereas the later melodies (sections 4 and 5) are more energetic and jovial in character.
