= Mephistos Höllenrufe =

1851 waltz composed by Johann Strauss II

Mephistos Höllenrufe (Summons of Mephistopheles from Hell or Cries of Mephistopheles from Hell), Op. 101, is a waltz composed by Johann Strauss II in 1851. It was first performed at the Vienna Volksgarten as part of a festival preceding Strauss' departure for a tour of Germany. The title of the composition is a quotation from the Bible: "And the devil [Mephistopheles] [...] was cast into the lake of fire and brimstone, where the beast and the false prophet are, and shall be tormented day and night for ever and ever" (Revelation, 20:10). A reporter for the Wiener Allgemeine Theaterzeitung commented on Strauss' waltz that it "received such a favourable reception, on account of its effective and original melodies and brilliant instrumentation, that it had to be repeated three times". Especially colourful, and keeping with the work's ominous title, is the second waltz theme: its cheerful, ascending tune is suddenly interrupted, and then answered by a sinister chromatic descending passage. Some of the waltz themes of the work (specifically, the waltzes 1C, 2A, 3A, 3B, 4A, 4B, 5A, and 5B) are found in close proximity to one another in the earliest of Strauss' "sketchbooks", and were probably written in the first half of 1851.
