= Abschied von St. Petersburg =

Abschied von St. Petersburg (Farewell to St. Petersburg), opus 210, is the name of a waltz composed by Johann Strauss II. The work was first performed at a benefit concert in Pavlovsk on September 5, 1858, as part of a tour of Russia that Strauss was conducting. In keeping with the vogue then current in Russia for the French language, the work was entitled as Mes adieux à St. Pétersbourg (My Farewell to St. Petersburg). Less than a week after his return to his home city of Vienna, Strauss conducted the first Viennese performance of the work at the Vienna Volksgarten.

A critic for the Wiener Allgemeine Theaterzeitung commented on Strauss' waltz: "The waltz Abschied von St. Petersburg distinguishes itself among the newly performed compositions by its alluring themes and interesting instrumentation; the composition has a predominantly serious Slavic character [...] Strauss was accorded extraordinary amounts of applause and had to repeat each new composition two or three times." However, despite the public and critical acclaim for the composition, Abschied von St. Petersburg did not remain long in the Strauss Orchestra's repertoire, and it is not very well known nowadays.

In keeping with the work's title, the waltz has a rather mournful quality about it: the composition begins with a passage for solo cello, which soon gives way to the melancholic opening waltz theme, a mood that is enhanced by the use of counter-melodies in the cello line. The composition does not end with a drumroll or flourish, as most of Strauss' other waltzes do, but instead fades away into the distance with a trumpet call, probably meant to symbolise the composer's carriage as it drives him away from Pavlovsk and St. Petersburg.
