= Idyllen =

Idyllen (Idylls), Op. 95, is a waltz composed by Johann Strauss II in 1851. It was composed for a "Grand Summer Festival Soiree" in the Vienna Volksgarten, with the composer conducting the Strauss Orchestra in its first performance. The fifth waltz melody of the work incorporates themes from the popular song O Madchen mein unter'm Hollerstock (O maiden mine beneath the rose-tree). The Theater Zeitung commented on the Strauss waltz that "it is most original and displays a multitude of piquant dance rhythms which are instrumented with much spirit and, amidst tumultuous applause from the select and numerous public, had to be played da capo."
