= Nachtfalter =

1854 waltz by Johann Strauss II

Nachtfalter (Moths) Op. 157, is a waltz by Johann Strauss II. It was first performed at a parish festival ball at Unger's Casino in the Vienna suburb of Hernals on 28 August 1854.

The double meaning of the German word Nachtfalter for 'moth' and 'nocturnal reveller' is captured in the two parts of the waltz, first depicting the whirring wings of the moth, then the gay melodies of Vienna's nightlife.
