= Wiener Bonbons =

Waltz by Johann Strauss II

- by Johann Strauss II
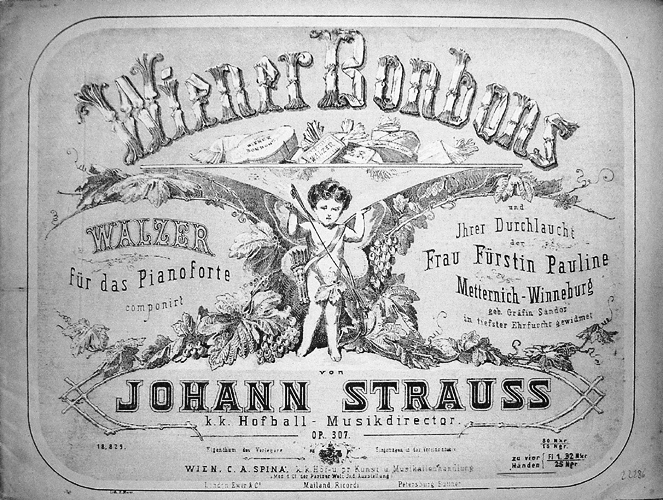
- Cover of the piano score
- Opus: 307
- Form: Waltz
- Composed: 1866
- Dedication: Princess Pauline Metternich-Winneburg
- Performed: 28 January 1866, Hofburg, Vienna

Wiener Bonbons (Vienna Sweets), Op. 307, is a waltz by Johann Strauss II written in 1866. It was first performed on 28 January 1866 at the ball of the Association of Industrial Societies held in the ball rooms of the Vienna Hofburg and was dedicated to the influential Princess Pauline Metternich-Winneburg, the wife of then Austrian ambassador to Paris.

The festivity was meant to raise funds to be donated to the construction of German hospitals in Paris. Strauss' younger brother Josef was initially supposed to be conducting music at the ball without his brother Johann's anticipated presence. Johann himself was happy to draw back from conducting at such occasions in addition to allowing Josef to compose a dedication piece for the event although at the last minute, the elder brother opted to contribute a waltz of his own to glorify the event. The result was the waltz "Wiener Bonbons", a Viennese waltz with Parisian flair. The title, "Vienna Bonbons", draws on both nationalities.

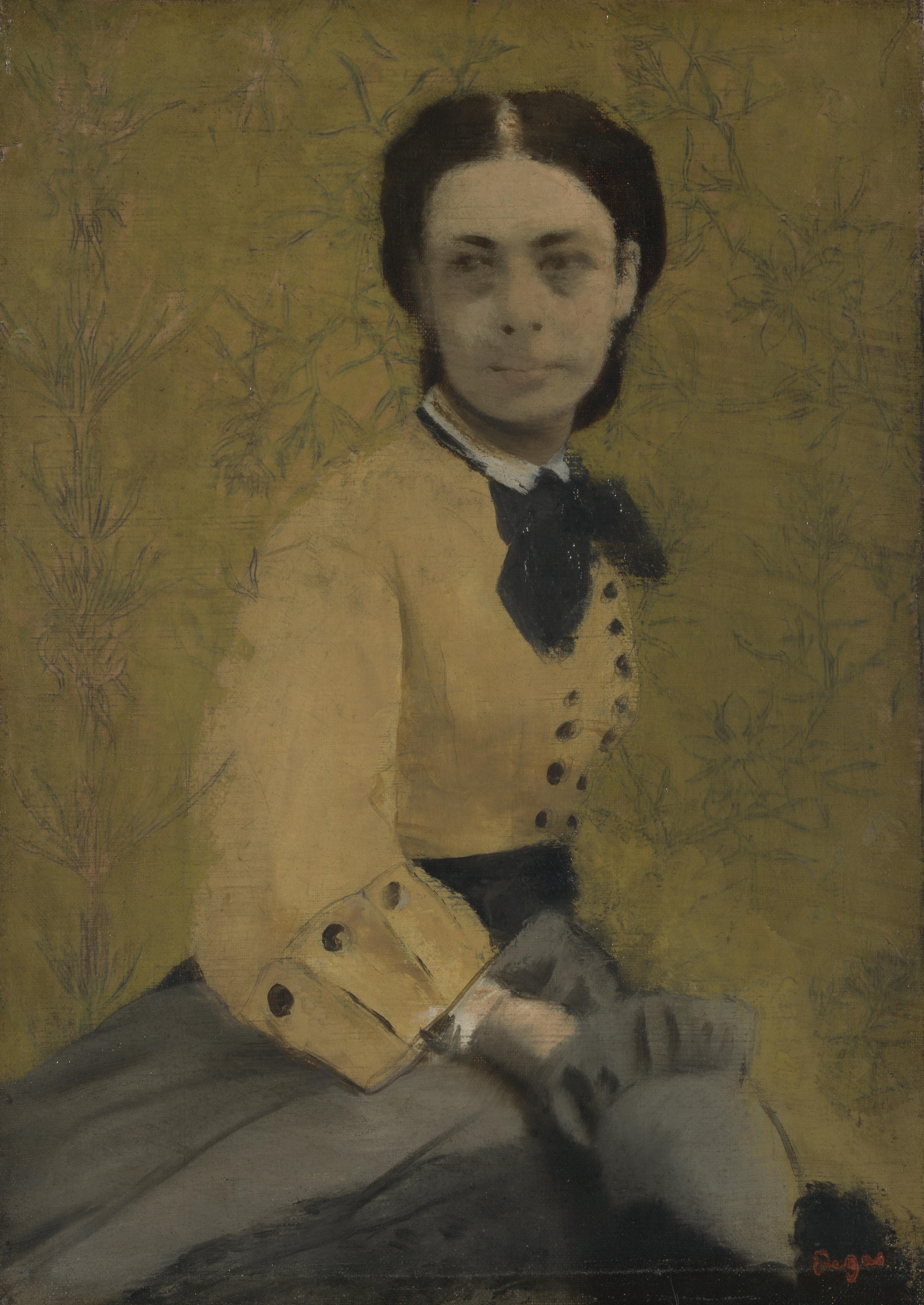
Pauline von Metternich (1865, by Edgar Degas)

Waltz 1

The waltz's introduction starts with clarinet and pizzicato strings in a relatively tense mood. Shortly, the first waltz theme makes a bold entry, long chords with a strong first beat in 3/4 time. Later sections are cheeky and flamboyant, contrasted with gentle and reflective melodies. After a short coda, the first waltz theme reappears before accelerating into its rousing finish, complete with a brass flourish underlined by a snare drumroll.
