= Karnevalsbotschafter =

Karnevalsbotschafter (Carnival's Ambassador) op. 270 is a waltz composed by Johann Strauss II in the autumn of 1862 during his honeymoon with his first wife Henrietta Treffz in Venice. It was first performed at the 50th anniversary celebration of the Vienna's Gesellschaft der Musikfreunde (Society of Friends of Music in Vienna) at the 'Sperl' dance hall on 11 November 1862.

Trumpets announce the first bars, before a loud chord interrupts; signalling the waltz proper. Pizzicato strings support the first waltz theme although other instruments carry the main melody. Waltz 1B is punctuated by loud chords and is loud for the entire passage. Waltz 2A has triangles as accompaniment whereas waltz 2B is gentle. Waltz 3A starts with a brief intrada and is decorated with trills whereas waltz 3B's principal melody is carried by cellos and double basses. Waltz 4A is livelier than the previous waltz part and waltz 4B is dominated by the flute. Waltz 5B has a timpani beat and waltz 5B reconciles the earlier sections. A brief coda is introduced and waltz 1B is repeated. Without halting nor slowing down for a moment, the first waltz theme makes a re-entry, before rising chords heralds its close, complete with a snare-drumroll and brass flourish.
