= Wein, Weib und Gesang =

Viennese waltz by Johann Strauss II

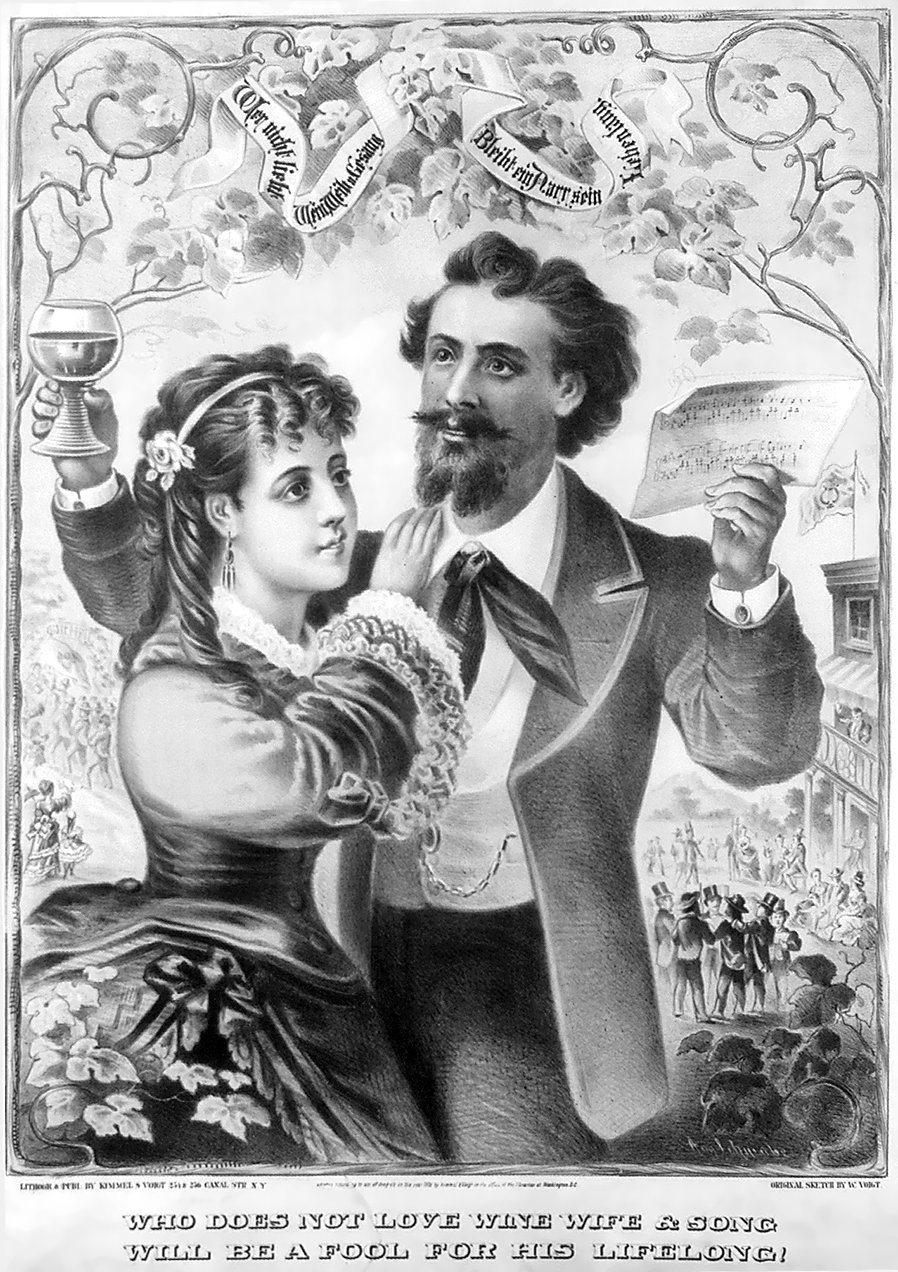
"Who does not Love Wine Wife & Song will be a Fool for his Lifelong!"

Wein, Weib und Gesang (Wine, Woman, and Song), Op. 333, is a Viennese waltz by Johann Strauss II. It is a choral waltz in its original form, although it is rarely heard in this version today. It was commissioned for the Vienna Men's Choral Association's so-called Fools' Evening on 2 February 1869 with a dedication to the Association's honorary chorus-master Johann Herbeck. Its fanciful title was drawn from an old adage: "Who loves not wine, women and song remains a fool his whole life long."

The waltz's admirers include the famous opera composer Richard Wagner and Strauss' good friend Johannes Brahms. There is an arrangement for piano, harmonium and string quartet by Alban Berg, which was performed in 1921 at the Society for Private Musical Performances in Vienna.

The waltz's primary home key is in E♭ major, with its introduction interpolating with B♭ major as well as B major. The first waltz melody, with its tapping quality is quintessentially Viennese in nature. Further waltz themes alternate between lush passion and good-humored cheekiness, ending with a swirling finish in the principal home key underlined by a brass fanfare and snare drumroll, as is the usual style of concluding a piece in Strauss' works dating around that time.

The title is also a German expression for having fun.

Waltz 1
