= Eduard Strauss =

Austrian composer

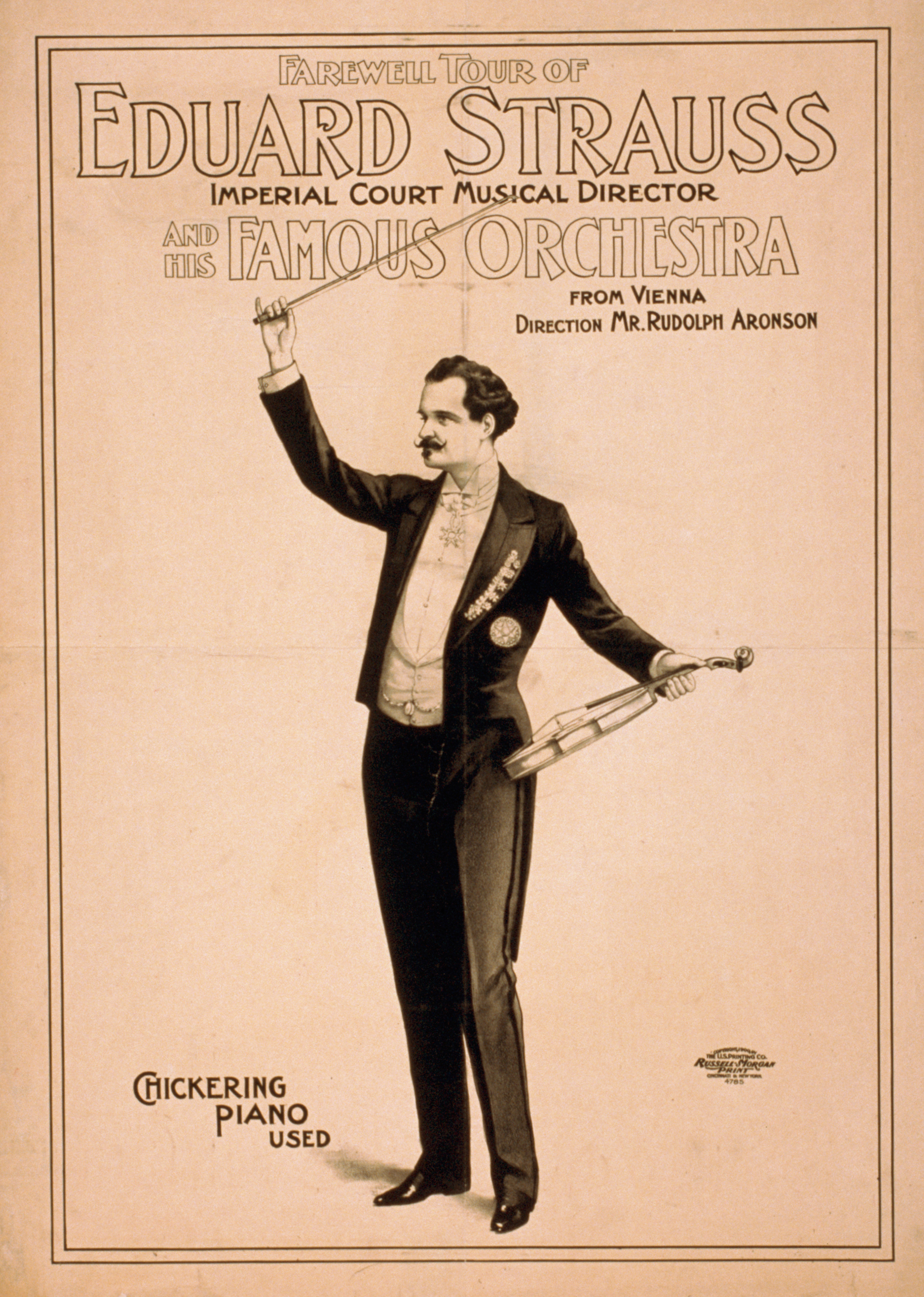
A drawing of Strauss on a concert poster

Eduard "Edi" Strauss I (15 March 1835 – 28 December 1916) was an Austrian composer who, together with his brothers Johann Strauss II and Josef Strauss made up the Strauss musical dynasty. He was the son of Johann Strauss I and Maria Anna Streim. The family dominated the Viennese light music world for decades, creating many waltzes and polkas for many Austrian nobility as well as dance-music enthusiasts around Europe. He was affectionately known in his family as 'Edi'.

== Life and music ==
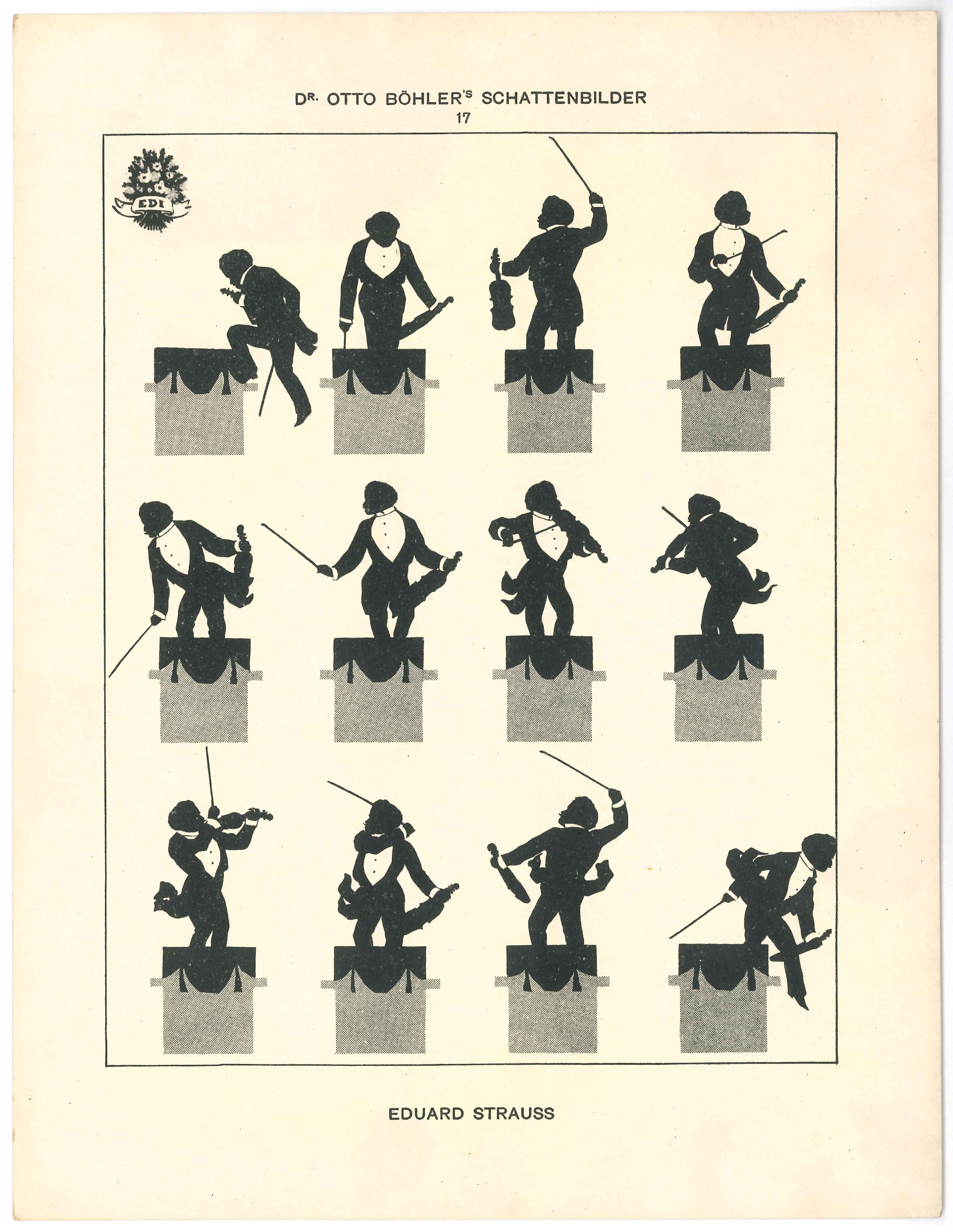
"Edi" Strauss, silhouette by Otto Böhler

Eduard Strauss' style was individual and did not attempt to emulate the works of his other brothers or his contemporaries. But he was primarily remembered and recognized as a dance music conductor rather than as a major composer in the Strauss family, and his popularity was overshadowed by that of his elder brothers. Realising this, he stamped his own mark with the quick polka, known in German as the "polka-schnell". Among the more popular polkas that he penned for the Strauss Orchestra, which he continued to conduct until its disbandment on 13 February 1901, were "Bahn Frei!", Op. 45, "Ausser Rand und Band", Op. 168, and "Ohne Bremse", Op. 238. He also found time to pen a few lovely waltzes, of which only a handful survived obscurity. The most famous is probably "Doctrinen", Op.79.

Strauss's musical career was pervaded with rivalry, not only from his brothers, but also from the military bandmaster and dance music composer Karl Michael Ziehrer, who even formed a rival orchestra called "Formerly Eduard Strauss Orchestra", and began giving concerts in Vienna under this new title. Eduard Strauss successfully filed a court action against Ziehrer for the improper and misleading use of his name, but Ziehrer would eventually surpass the Strauss family in popularity in Vienna, particularly after the deaths of his more talented brothers, Johann Strauss II and Josef Strauss. Their rivalry was to extend until the Strauss Orchestra was disbanded.

Strauss married Maria Klenkhart on 8 January 1863 and had two sons, Johann Strauss III and Josef Eduard Strauss. The elder son, Johann Strauss III, was to lead the Strauss revival well into the 20th century. Josef Eduard's son, Eduard Strauss II, was active as a conductor.

However, personal setbacks in the 1890s, such as the death of brother Johann Strauss II in 1899, and his realization that his immediate family had squandered his personal fortune, led Eduard Strauss to decide on retirement. Eduard Strauss engaged in the final tour of his musical career to North America in 1899 and in 1901, disbanded the Strauss Orchestra, and returned to Vienna, where he died in 1916. He retired from public life and never actively took part in any public musical activity, although he did document his family memoirs titled Erinnerungen in 1906. He is buried in Zentralfriedhof (Vienna) cemetery.

Since 1825, the Strauss Orchestra Archives collected the compositions of not only Eduard, but of Johann II and the rest of the Strauss family. In October 1907, Eduard presided over the burning of many Strauss family musical manuscripts. Eighty years later, conductors Alfred Walker and Klaus Heymann managed to put together a semi-complete collection of Johann's works (according to Johann Strauss II: The Complete Orchestral Edition).

== Works of Eduard Strauss ==
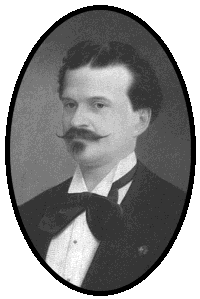
Eduard Strauss

== Works with Strauss brothers ==
- Trifolien waltz, ('Trefoil') (with Johann II and Josef Strauss) (1865)
- Schützen quadrille, ('Sharpshooter') (with Johann II and Josef Strauss) (1866)

== See also ==
- The Strauss Family – TV Drama
- Strauss Museum Vienna
