= Sofiensaal =

Concert hall and recording venue in Vienna

Coordinates: 48°12′24″N 16°23′26″E

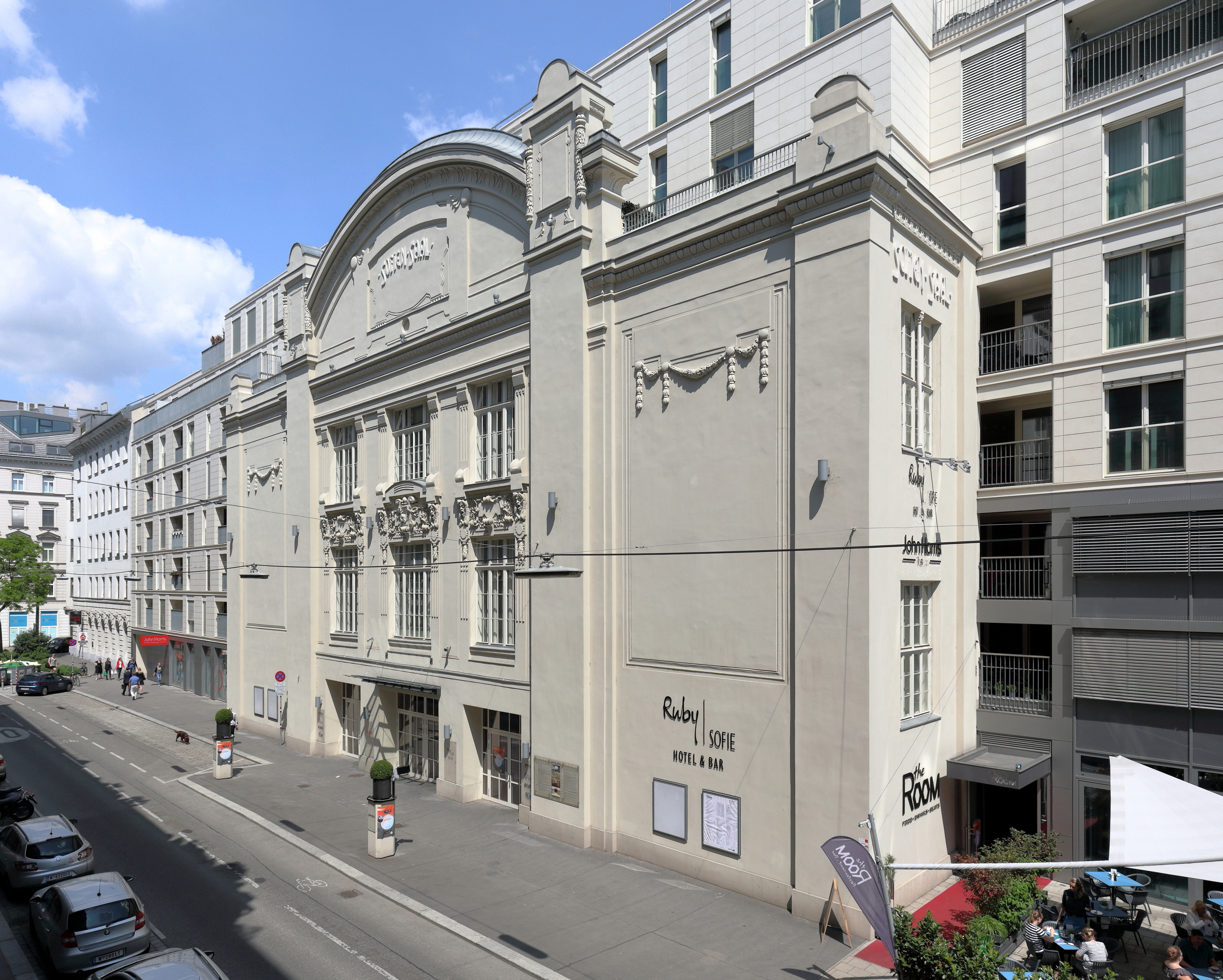
The Sofiensaal in 2017, after renovations

In 2006, before renovations

The building in 1900

The Sofiensaal is a concert hall and recording venue located in Vienna, Austria. It is situated on Marxergasse, in the city's third district of Landstraße. The building burned down on 16 August 2001, but it was rebuilt and opened once again in December 2013.

== Creation and initial use ==
The building was completed in 1826. It was named after Princess Sophie of Bavaria, the mother of Emperor Franz Josef I. It was originally used as a steam bath and known as the Sofienbad. Between 1845 and 1849, it was converted by the architects August Sicard von Sicardsburg and Eduard van der Nüll into a dance hall and renamed the Sofiensaal. Johann Strauss I performed there regularly and conducted at the opening ball of the house in 1848. Many of the Strauss family's waltzes were first performed there.

== Use as a recording venue ==
The building's large, vaulted ceiling, and the pool beneath the floor, gives the hall excellent acoustic properties. For this reason, Decca Records adopted the building as its principal European recording venue from 1955 to the mid-1980s. The senior producer of classical recordings for the company for much of this time was John Culshaw, who revolutionised the recording of classical music, particularly opera with the Decca tree. Notable recordings made at the Sofiensaal during this period included the first complete studio recording of Wagner's Ring Cycle, conducted by Georg Solti.

== Destruction and restoration ==
In the years before the fire, the Sofiensaal fell into disuse as a recording studio and was used for parties and discos. The last recording made there before the fire, in July 2001, was of Arcadi Volodos playing solo piano works by Franz Schubert.

In May 2001, the building's owners announced that it would be used as a conference centre. However, it was destroyed by fire on 16 August 2001, due to careless routine maintenance work. The fire burned for more than eight hours and completely destroyed the main ballroom, although the facade and walls of the building survived. Some of the decorative stucco work on the walls survived the fire, as did the adjacent Blauer Salon, a small side venue. There were no reported deaths or injuries.

In January 2006, it was announced that the Sofiensaal was to be redeveloped and converted into apartments, although the plans changed, building the apartments around the facade. The new owner, ifa AG, painstakingly rebuilt the historic ballroom and listed historical façade. They also used the surrounding 12,000 square metre area to create the originally planned apartments, a hotel, a catering company, a fitness studio, and various function rooms. It was finally reopened in December 2013. During the reopening ceremony, the hall was filled with celebrity guests who watched the history of the location as well as a finale through the use of 3D projections from Christie projectors.
