= Rosen aus dem Süden =

1880 waltz by Johann Strauss II

- Waltz medley by Johann Strauss II
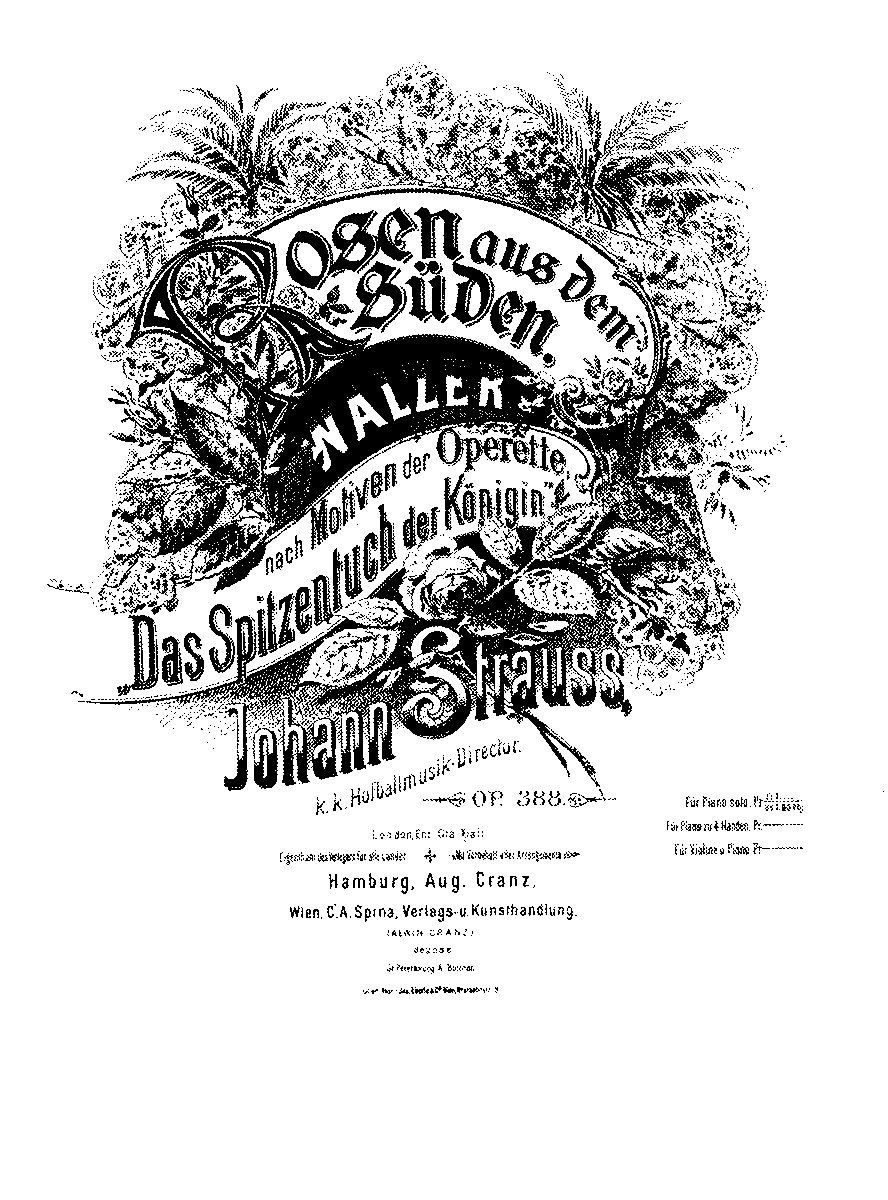
- Cover of the piano score
- Opus: 388
- Dedication: King Umberto I of Italy
- Section from "Rosen aus dem Süden"

"Rosen aus dem Süden" ("Roses from the South"), Op. 388, is a waltz medley composed by Johann Strauss II in 1880 with its themes drawn from the operetta Das Spitzentuch der Königin (The Queen's Lace Handkerchief). Strauss dedicated the waltz to King Umberto I of Italy.

== First performance ==
The waltz was first performed at the regular Sunday concerts of the Strauss Orchestra conducted by Eduard Strauss on 7 November 1880 at the Musikverein in Vienna. Its themes drawn from the operetta are the act 1 "Trüffel-Couplet" and the act 2 romance "Wo die wilde Rose erblüht" ("Where the Wild Rose Blossoms"). The act 2 romance inspired the title of the waltz.

== Instrumentation ==
The waltz is scored for an orchestra of 2 flutes (2nd doubling piccolo), 2 oboes, 2 clarinets in C, 2 bassoons, 4 French horns in F, 2 trumpets in F, 3 trombones, timpani, snare drum, triangle, bass drum, cymbals, harp, and strings.

== Description ==
The waltz ranks among the "Waltz King"'s most notable works and is still regularly performed today at the Vienna Philharmonic's New Year's Concert. The general mood of the piece is rather pensive but the final moments of the piece are utter joy and sparkling with Strauss happier tunes. Waltz section 1 is in F major and is graceful but pensive in mood. Waltz 2A is also in a more reflective mood but waltz 2B is more uplifting. The entire waltz 3 section is in G major while waltz section 4 is in E♭ major and has the climax with cymbals. A restless-sounding coda in E♭ is soon replaced with a reprise of the waltz 3A. Waltz 1A has a brief show at the end before the waltz 4B is introduced, this time in the home key of F major. A series of descending chords marks the end of the waltz, underlined with a drum roll and final flourish.

== Schoenberg arrangement ==
Arnold Schoenberg arranged this waltz as part of a special concert for his Society for Private Musical Performances in 1921, along with Webern's arrangement of the Schatz-Walzer and Berg's arrangement of Wein, Weib und Gesang.

== In popular culture ==
In the Star Trek episode "The Squire of Gothos", Trelane has Nyota Uhura play this waltz.

Michaela and Sully dance to this waltz during the Dr. Quinn, Medicine Woman season 2 episode "Where the Heart Is."

The piece is also used in the Dancing with the Stars video game for the PlayStation 2 and the 1927 film Sunrise: A Song of Two Humans during the carnival sequence.

The waltz appears uncredited in the dance scene in the 2012 film The Dark Knight Rises starring Christian Bale and Michael Caine.

The waltz appears briefly during Lisle Von Rhuman's party scene in the 1992 film Death Becomes Her.

A few bars of the waltz are played by Adam Stanton on a piano in the 1949 film All the King's Men.
