= Little Songs =

Little Songs may refer to:

== Classical music ==
- Little Songs, by John J. Becker
- Three Little Songs, a work by Igor Stravinsky
- 5 Little Songs, a composition by Reynaldo Hahn

== Albums ==
- Little Songs (David Usher album), 1998
- Little Songs (Jon Guerra album), 2015
- Little Songs (Colter Wall album), 2023
- Little Songs, a children's album in Iran by Hengameh Mofid

== Other uses ==
- Little Songs, a publication of poems by Marjorie Pickthall
- "Little Songs", song by The Microphones on the album Tests
