= Berceuses du chat =

4 songs by Igor Stravinsky (1915)

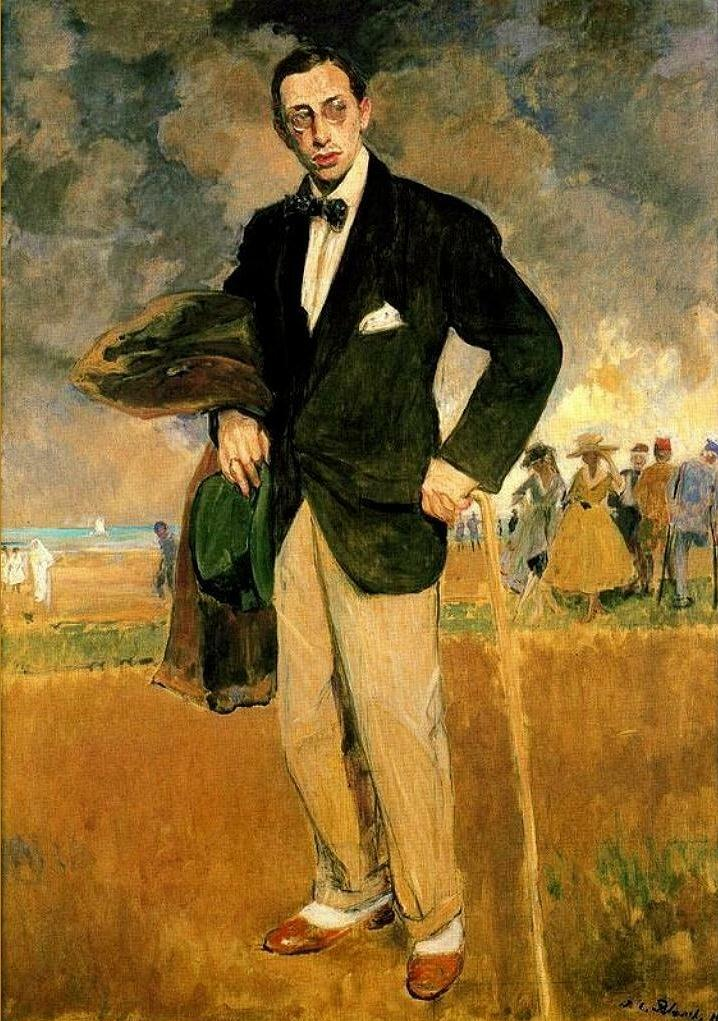
Portrait of Igor Stravinsky by Jacques-Émile Blanche (1915)

Berceuses du chat, K022 (Russian: Колыбельные, Kolibelniye, English: (Cat) Lullabies) by Igor Stravinsky is a 1915 cycle of four songs for a medium voice, usually a contralto, and three clarinetists. The work is usually referred to by its French title. Although it is often sung in Russian, Stravinsky assisted his friend, the Swiss author C. F. Ramuz, to make a translation into French at the time of publication. The cycle is set for contralto and three clarinettists: E♭ clarinet; A clarinet (normally played by a B♭ clarinet), and a B♭ bass clarinet.

== Songs ==
The titles of the four songs are:

1. "Cпи котъ" (Spi kot) / "Dors sur le poêle" ([Cat] Sleeps on the stove)
2. "Котъ на печи" (Kot na pechi) / "Intérieur" (Cat on the stove)
3. "Бай-Бай" (Bay-Bay) / "Dodo" (Cradle song)
4. "У кота, кота" (U kota, kota) / "Ce qi'il a, le chat" (O cat, cat)

The French titles for songs 2 to 4 are not translations; nos 2 and 3 are poetic titles, no. 4 is the French incipit. The cat is a male cat – кот, not кошка (koshka).

== History ==
The Berceuses du chat were composed in 1915/16 while Stravinsky was living in Clarens, Switzerland, during World War I. They are based on Russian folk songs found in the collection of Russian folklorist Pyotr Kireevsky. Stravinsky had purchased the volume in Kiev during his last trip to Kiev in July 1914, just before the outbreak of the war. Helmut Kirchmeyer states that the texts are based on Russian folksongs, but the melodies are Stravinsky's.

Stravinsky dedicated the work to Natalia Goncharova and Mikhail Larionov.

The cycle was first published in Geneva by Adolphe Henn in 1917, and subsequently reissued by J. W. Chester (London) in 1923 with Russian, French (by Ramuz) and German (by Rudolf Stephan Hoffman, 1878–1931) texts.

== Premières ==
Berceuses du chat was first heard in Paris (Salle des Agriculteurs) on November 20, 1918, in a program that also included the slightly earlier Pribaoutki; both works were accompanied by piano in this performance. The first performance with clarinets was given in Vienna on June 6, 1919, at a concert of Arnold Schoenberg's Society for Private Musical Performances. Again, the program also included the Pribaoutki.
