= Daniel Stratievsky =

Soviet-born Israeli conductor based in Germany

- Born: 1986 (age 38–39); Leningrad
- Education: University of Music and Performing Arts Munich
- Occupation: Conductor
- Organizations: Landestheater Neustrelitz; Kammeroper Frankfurt

Daniel Stratievsky (born 1986) is a Soviet-born Israeli conductor based in Germany. Working freelance, he has been the regular conductor of the Kammeroper Frankfurt, a company for chamber opera. He is the grandson of the Soviet painter Lev Razumovsky.

== Life and career ==
Stratievsky was born in Leningrad in 1986. He grew up in Israel, where he studied piano, conducting and composition. He studied further at the University of Music and Performing Arts Munich, conducting with Bruno Weil, where he graduated with a master's degree in 2013. He became conductor of the ESME Orchestra in Munich, and then second Kapellmeister at the Landestheater Neustrelitz. As a guest, he conducted the Münchner Symphoniker, the Bad Reichenhaller Philharmoniker, the Bundesjugendorchester, the Junge Münchner Philharmonie, the Georgisches Kammerorchester Ingolstadt, the Israel Sinfonietta Beer Sheva, the Jugendsinfonieorchester Wetterau and the Saint Petersburg Philharmonic Orchestra.

He has been musical director of the Kammeroper Frankfurt since 2019, a company for chamber opera that has since mainly produced Rossini's operas. In 2023 Stratievsky conducted La scala di seta which music reviewer Guido Holze from the Frankfurter Allgemeine Zeitung described as "loose, bouncy and very singer-friendly, rather too slim than too thick" ("locker, federnd und sehr sängerfreundlich, eher zu schlank als zu dick").
