= Hélène Lindqvist =

Swedish singer and artist (born 1968)

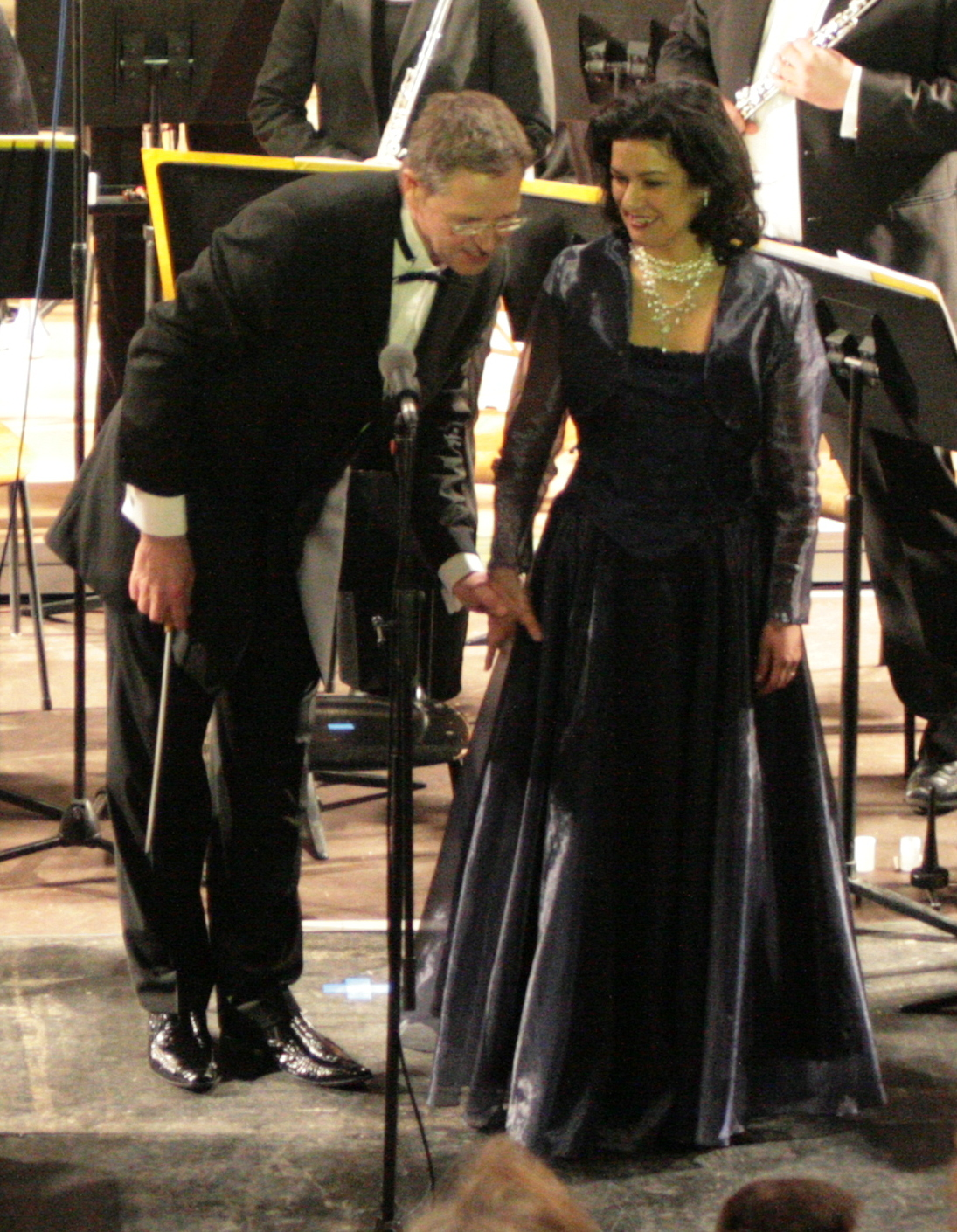
- Lindqvist with conductor Douglas Bostock and the Ulm symphonic wind orchestra, 2009
- Born: 1968 (age 57–58); Stockholm, Sweden
- Education: Hochschule für Musik Saar; Mozarteum University Salzburg
- Occupations: Soprano singer; visual artist
- Years active: 1990s–present
- Musical career
- Genres: Opera; operetta; oratorio; art song; musical theatre
- Website: artoflindqvist.com

Hélène Lindqvist (born 1968 in Stockholm, Sweden) is a Swedish soprano who sings opera, operetta, oratorio, art song and musical theatre. Currently, she is pursuing a career in visual arts.

== Life and career ==
Lindqvist is of Swedish and Egyptian descent. She began her vocal training in Stockholm with Florence Düselius. She then studied at the University of Music in Saarbrücken, Germany, and at the Mozarteum in Salzburg, Austria. While there in 1995, she passed the exam to be a soloist in the musical theater. She took singing lessons with Jessica Cash, Éva Marton and Bernd Weikl, in addition to Renate Stoll-Bellmann.

Lindqvist had her first engagements at the Kammeroper Frankfurt, with the broadcaster Norddeutscher Rundfunk (NDR) and with the Ensemble Alta Musica Frankfurt. From 1996 to 1999, she was a permanent member of the Saarland State Theater. There she performed roles including Ännchen in Weber's Der Freischütz, Ilia in Mozart's Idomeneo, Kriemhild in the operetta The Merry Nibelungs, Belinda in Purcell's Dido and Aeneas, the Hitomaru in the Die Reise. She had a guest engagement at Theater Regensburg for 2001/2002 and 2009/2010, where she appeared as Gilda in Verdi's Rigoletto, Franziska Cagliari in Wiener Blut, Morgana in Alcina, Nuri in d'Albert's Tiefland and Tatyana in Tchaikovsky's Eugene Onegin. Additional guest engagements followed at the Hamburg State Opera as Damigella/Fortuna in Monteverdi's L'incoronazioe di Poppea, and the Theater Augsburg as Gilda.

Her extensive repertoire includes many Baroque operas, as well as the roles of Donna Anna in Mozart's Don Giovanni, Violetta Valéry in Verdi's La traviata, Fiordiligi in Mozart's Così fan tutte, Micaela in Bizet's Carmen and Desdemona in Verdi's Otello.

In 2004, Lindqvist undertook a tour in Japan, where she appeared as the Countess in Mozart's The Marriage of Figaro. She also took a concert tour through Egypt.

From 2006 to 2009, Lindqvist was a regular ensemble member of the Theater Ulm, where she performed as Konstanze in Mozart's Die Entführung aus dem Serail, Ninetta in Prokofiev's The Love for Three Oranges, Gilda in Verdi's Rigoletto, Electress Marie in Zeller's Der Vogelhändler, Fiorilla in Rossini's Il turco in Italia, the title role of Handel's Alcina, Euridice in Gluck's Orfeo ed Euridice and also Mary Magdalene in Jesus Christ Superstar.

Meanwhile, as a freelance artist, Lindqvist is in demand, both in Germany and abroad, as a concert and art song singer. Her repertoire reaches from the early Baroque, concerning sacred compositions, through the modern period. This encompasses works by Johann Sebastian Bach, Anton Bruckner, Arnold Schoenberg, Gustav Mahler, Gunnar de Frumerie, Alban Berg, Dimitri Terzakis, Antonín Dvořák, Lili Boulanger and Nadia Boulanger.

Lindqvist currently practices visual arts – primarily painting, sculpture, and mixed-media collage – at her studio in Augsburg. She often takes inspiration from her music career in her art.

== The Art Song Project ==
In 2000, Lindqvist married pianist Philipp Vogler, a colleague at the opera house in Saarbrücken. They have two daughters, Mimi and Josefin, who won the seventh season of The Voice Kids Deutschland in 2019.

In 2011, Lindqvist and her husband started The Art Song Project. The site is intended to bring the works of lesser known art song composers to the attention of the public. In 2012, the duo released a CD recording of Anton Rubinstein's Persian Love Songs to generally positive reviews, and in 2013, they released another CD, featuring 24 lieder by Heinrich von Herzogenberg.

== Awards ==
- First Prize in the international art song competition, Concerto delle donne in Kassel, Germany
- Second Prize in the Walter Gieseking Competition in Saarbrücken, Germany
- Finalist in the Marjorie Lawrence Competition in Washington, D.C.

== Discography ==
- Alban Berg: Jugendlieder (Col Legno, 2006)
- Gustav Mahler: Symphony No. 4 Taschenphilharmonie/Stangel (NEOS, 2005)
- Dimitri Terzakis: Daphnis and Chloe: Solo for Soprano no. 2; Songs without Words (Col Legno, 2005)
- Gunnar de Frumerie, Songs: Phoenix No. 1 (Valve-Hearts, 1997)
