= Igor Stravinsky discography =

This is a listing of all of Igor Stravinsky's commercially released studio recordings as a conductor or as a pianist; it also includes recordings conducted by Robert Craft "under the supervision of the composer." Works are arranged in chronological order by date of composition.

Symphony in E-flat

- Columbia Symphony Orchestra; Igor Stravinsky (May 2, 1966 – Hollywood)

The Faun and the Shepherdess

- Mary Simmons (m-s); CBC Symphony Orchestra; Igor Stravinsky (May 7–8, 1964 – Toronto)

Pastorale

- Samuel Dushkin (vn); Gromer (ob); Durand (Eng hn); Vacelier (cl); Grandmaison (bsn); Igor Stravinsky (Jun. 6, 1933 – Paris)
- Joseph Szigeti (vn); Mitchell Miller (ob); R. McGinnis (cl); D. Gassman (Eng hn); Sol Schoenbach (bsn); Igor Stravinsky (Feb. 9, 1946 – New York)
- Israel Baker (vn); Columbia Chamber Ensemble; Igor Stravinsky (Oct. 26, 1965 – Hollywood)

Scherzo fantastique

- CBC Symphony Orchestra; Igor Stravinsky (Dec. 1, 1962 – Toronto)

Feu d'artifice (Fireworks)

- Philharmonic-Symphony Orchestra of New York; Igor Stravinsky (Jan. 28, 1946 – New York)
- Columbia Symphony Orchestra; Igor Stravinsky (Dec. 17, 1963 – New York)

The Firebird

- Walther Straram Concerts Orchestra; Igor Stravinsky (1919 suite, Nov. 8–10, 1928, Theatre des Champs Elysees – Paris)
- Samuel Dushkin (vn); Igor Stravinsky (pn) (Scherzo & Berceuse, Jun. 6–8, 1933 – Paris)
- Philharmonic-Symphony Orchestra of New York; Igor Stravinsky (1945 suite without connecting interludes, Jan. 28, 1946 – New York)
- Columbia Symphony Orchestra; Igor Stravinsky (complete ballet, Jan. 23–25, 1961 – Hollywood)
- Columbia Symphony Orchestra; Igor Stravinsky (1945 suite, Jan. 18, 1967 ≠ Hollywood)

Two Poems of Verlaine

- Donald Gramm (b); Columbia Symphony Orchestra; Igor Stravinsky (Dec. 11, 1964; Sept. 26, 1966 – New York)

Petrushka

- [The Symphony Orchestra]; Igor Stravinsky (abridged original version, Jun. 27–28, 1928 – London)
- Samuel Dushkin (vn); Igor Stravinsky (pn) (Danse russe, Jun. 6–8, 1933 – Paris)
- Philharmonic-Symphony Orchestra of New York; Igor Stravinsky (suite from the 1911 version, Apr. 29, 1940 – New York)
- Columbia Symphony Orchestra; Igor Stravinsky (1946 revised orchestration of the complete ballet, Feb. 12, 15, 17, 1960 – Hollywood)

Two Poems of Balmont

- Marni Nixon (s); Arthur Gleghorn, A. Hoberman (fl); Hugo Raimondi, Lloyd Ulyate (cl); Israel Baker, D. Albert (vn); Cecil Figelski (va); Howard Colf (vc); Igor Stravinsky (July 28, 1955 – Hollywood)
- Evelyn Lear (s); Louise di Tullio, Sheridan Stokes (fl); Hugo Raimonde & John Neufeld (cl); Israel Baker & Harold Dicterow (vn); Robert Craft (Jan. 24, 1967 – Hollywood)

Le roi des étoiles (Zvezdoliki)

- Festival Singers of Toronto; CBC Symphony Orchestra; Igor Stravinsky (Nov. 29, 1962 – Toronto)

The Rite of Spring

- Walther Straram Concerts Orchestra; Igor Stravinsky (1928 – Paris)
- Philharmonic-Symphony Orchestra of New York; Igor Stravinsky (Apr. 29, 1940 – New York)
- Columbia Symphony Orchestra; Igor Stravinsky (with 1943 revised Danse sacrale, Jan. 5–6, 1960 – New York)

Three Japanese Lyrics

- Marni Nixon (s); Arthur Gleghorn, A. Hoberman (fl); Hugo Raimondi, Lloyd Ulyate (cl); Israel Baker, D. Albert (vn); Cecil Figelski (va); Howard Colf (vc); Igor Stravinsky (July 28, 1955 – Hollywood)
- Evelyn Lear (s); Louise di Tullio, Sheridan Stokes (fl); Hugo Raimonde, John Neufeld (cl); Israel Baker, Harold Dicterow (vn); Robert Craft (Jun. 10, 1968 – Hollywood)

Three Little Songs

- Marilyn Horne (m-s); [chamber orchestra]; Igor Stravinsky (July 28, 1955 – Hollywood)
- Cathy Berberian (m-s); Columbia Symphony Orchestra; Igor Stravinsky (Dec. 11, 1964 – New York)

The Nightingale

- Samuel Dushkin (vn); Igor Stravinsky (pn) (The Nightingale & Chinese March, Jun. 6–8, 1933 – Paris)
- Reri Grist, Marina Picassi (s); Elaine Bonazzi (a); Loren Driscoll, Stanley Kolk, Carl Kaiser (t); Kenneth Smith, Herbert Beattie, Donald Gramm, W. Murphy (b); Chorus & Orchestra of the Opera Society of Washington; Igor Stravinsky (Dec. 29, 31, 1960 – Washington D.C.)
- Columbia Symphony Orchestra; Robert Craft (Song of the Nightingale, Jan. 23, 1967 – Hollywood)

Pribaoutki

- Cathy Berberian (m-s); Columbia Chamber Orchestra; Igor Stravinsky (Dec. 11, 1964 – New York)

Berceuses du chat

- Cathy Berberian (m-s); Paul E. Howland, Jack Kreiselman & Charles Russo (cl); Igor Stravinsky (Dec. 14, 1964 – New York)

Renard

- George Shirley, Loren Driscoll (t); William Murphy (bar); Donald Gramm (b); Toni Koves (cimb); Columbia Chamber Ensemble; Igor Stravinsky (Jan. 26, 1962 – New York)

Four Russian Peasant Songs

- Marni Nixon (s); Marilynn Horne (s); [female choir]; James Decker, Sinclair Lott, George Hyde, H. Markowitz (hn); Igor Stravinsky (July 28, 1955 – Hollywood)
- Gregg Smith Singers; Columbia Symphony members; Igor Stravinsky (Aug. 20, 1965 – Hollywood)

Les noces

- Kate Winter (s); Linda Seymour (m-s); Parry Jones (t); Roy Henderson (b); [chorus & ensemble]; Igor Stravinsky (Jun. 1934 – London)
- Mildred Allen (s); Regina Sarfaty (m-s); Loren Driscoll (t); Robert Oliver (b); American Concert Choir; Samuel Barber, Aaron Copland, Lukas Foss, Roger Sessions (pn); Columbia Percussion Ensemble; Igor Stravinsky (Dec. 21, 1959 – New York)
- Mildred Allen (s); Adrienne Albert (m-s); Jack Litten (t); William Metcalf (b); Gregg Smith Singers; Ithaca College Concert Choir; Columbia Percussion Ensemble; Robert Craft (Dec 21, 1965 – New York)

L'Histoire du soldat

- Darrieux (vn); Boussagol (cbs); Godeau (cl); Dherin (bsn); Foveau (tpt); Delbos (tbn); Jean Paul Morel (perc); Igor Stravinsky (1932 – Paris)
- Alexander Schneider (vn); Julius Levine (cbs); David Oppenheim (cl); Loren Glickman (bsn); Robert Nagel (tpt); Erwin Price (tbn); Alfred Howard (perc); Igor Stravinsky (Jan. 27, 1954 – New York)
- Israel Baker (vn); Richard Kelley (cbs); Roy D'Antonio (cl); Don Christlieb (bsn); Charles Brady (tpt); Robert Marsteller (tbn); William Kraft (perc); Igor Stravinsky (Feb. 10 & 13, 1961 – Hollywood)

Ragtime

- [chamber ensemble]; Igor Stravinsky (c. 1934 – Paris)
- Toni Koves (cimbalom); Columbia Chamber Orchestra; Igor Stravinsky (Jan. 26, 1962 – New York)

Piano-Rag-Music

- Igor Stravinsky (pn) (c. 1934 – Paris)

Pulcinella

- [orchestra]; Igor Stravinsky (Nos. 5–8 of concert suite, 1927/32 – Paris)
- Samuel Dushkin (vn); Igor Stravinsky (pn) (Suite Italienne Nos. 2 & 5, Jun. 6–8, 1933 – Paris)
- Mary Simmons (s); Glenn Schnittke (t); Phillip MacGregor (bs); Cleveland Orchestra; Igor Stravinsky (Dec. 14, 1953 – Cleveland)
- Irene Jordan (s); George Shirley (t); Donald Gramm (bs); Columbia Symphony Orchestra; Igor Stravinsky (Aug. 23, 1965 – Hollywood)
- Columbia Symphony Orchestra; Igor Stravinsky (concert suite, Aug. 25, 1965 – Hollywood)

Concertino for 12 Instruments

- Columbia Chamber Ensemble; Igor Stravinsky (Oct. 26, 1965 – Hollywood)

Symphonies of Wind Instruments

- Wind ensemble of Cologne Radio Symphony Orchestra; Igor Stravinsky (Oct. 7, 1951 – Cologne)
- Columbia Symphony Winds and Brass; Robert Craft (Oct. 11, 1966 – New York)

Suites Nos. 1 & 2 for Small Orchestra

- CBC Symphony Orchestra; Igor Stravinsky (Mar. 29–30, 1963 – Toronto)

Mavra

- Joseph Szigeti (vn); Igor Stravinsky (pn) (Parasha's Song, May 9, 1946 – New York)
- Susan Belink (s); Mary Simmons (m-s); Patricia Rideout (a); Stanley Kolk (t); CBC Symphony Orchestra; Igor Stravinsky (May 7–8, 1964 – Toronto)

Octet for wind instruments

- Marcel Moyse (fl); Godeau (cl); Dherin & Piard (bsn); Foveau, Vignal (tpt); Lafosse, Delbos (tbn); Igor Stravinsky (1932 – Paris)
- Julius Baker (fl); David Oppenheim (cl); Loren Glickman, Sylvia Deutscher (bsn); Robert Nagel, Ted Weis (tpt); Erwin Price, Richard Hixon (tbn); Igor Stravinsky (Jan. 26, 1954 – New York)
- James Pellerite (fl); David Oppenheim (cl); Loren Glickman, Arthur Weisberg (bsn); Robert Nagel, Ted Weis (tpt); Keith Brown, Richard Hixon (tbn); Igor Stravinsky (Jan. 5, 1961 – New York)

Concerto for Piano and Wind Instruments

- Soulima Stravinsky (pn); RCA Victor Symphony Orchestra; Igor Stravinsky (1949 – New York)
- Philippe Entremont (pn); Columbia Symphony Orchestra; Igor Stravinsky (May 13, 1964 – New York)

Serenade in A

- Igor Stravinsky (pn) (c. 1934 – Paris)

Pater Noster

- Choir of the Church of the Blessed Sacrament; Igor Stravinsky (Apr. 1949 – New York)
- Festival Singers of Toronto; Igor Stravinsky (Slavonic version, May 7–8, 1964 – Toronto)

Oedipus Rex

- Werner Hessenland (nar); Jean Cocteau (nar - Columbia ed.); Martha Mödl (m-s); Peter Pears, Helmut Krebs (t); Heinz Rehfuss (bar); Otto von Rohr (b); Cologne Radio Symphony Chorus and Orchestra; Igor Stravinsky (Oct. 7, 1951 – Cologne)
- John Westbrook (nar); Shirley Verrett (m-s); George Shirley, Loren Driscoll (t); John Reardon (bar); Donald Gramm, Chester Watson (b); Chorus and Orchestra of the Opera Society of Washington; Igor Stravinsky (Jan. 20, 1961 – Washington D.C.)

Apollo

- RCA Victor Orchestra; Igor Stravinsky (1950 – New York)
- Cologne Radio Symphony Orchestra; Igor Stravinsky (Oct. 7, 1951 – Cologne)
- Columbia Symphony Orchestra; Igor Stravinsky (Jan. 29, Dec. 11, 1964 – New York)

The Fairy's Kiss

- Victor Symphony Orchestra; Igor Stravinsky (Divertimento, 1940 – Mexico City)
- RCA Victor Symphony Orchestra; Igor Stravinsky (Divertimento, 1947 – Hollywood)
- Cleveland Orchestra; Igor Stravinsky (Dec. 11, 1955 – Cleveland)
- Columbia Symphony Orchestra; Igor Stravinsky (Aug. 19-20, 1965 – Hollywood)

Four Etudes for Orchestra

- CBC Symphony Orchestra; Igor Stravinsky (Nov. 29, Dec. 1, 1962 – Toronto)

Capriccio for Piano and Orchestra

- Igor Stravinsky (pn); Straram Orchestra; Ernest Ansermet (May 8–10, 1930 – Paris)
- Philippe Entremont (pn); Columbia Symphony Orchestra; Robert Craft (Jan. 3, 1966 – New York)

Symphony of Psalms

- Alexei Vlassoff Choir; [symphony orchestra]; Igor Stravinsky (Feb. 1931 – Paris)
- Columbia Broadcasting Symphony Orchestra & Chorus; Igor Stravinsky (Dec. 19, 1946)
- Festival Singers of Toronto; CBC Symphony Orchestra; Igor Stravinsky (Mar. 30, 1963)

Concerto in D for Violin and Orchestra

- Samuel Dushkin (vn); Lamoureux Orchestra; Igor Stravinsky (1932 – Paris)
- Isaac Stern (vn); Columbia Symphony Orchestra; Igor Stravinsky (Jun. 29-30, 1960 – Hollywood)

Duo Concertant

- Samuel Dushkin (vn); Igor Stravinsky (pn) (1933 – Paris)
- Joseph Szigeti (vn); Igor Stravinsky (pn) (Oct. 11, 13, 1945 – New York)

Credo

- Gregg Smith Singers; Igor Stravinsky (Slavonic version, Aug. 20, 1965 – Hollywood)

Perséphone

- Vera Zorina (nar); Richard Robinson (t); Westminster Choir; New York Philharmonic; Igor Stravinsky (Jan. 14, 1957)
- Vera Zorina (nar); Michele Molese (t); Gregg Smith Singers; Texas Boys Choir; Columbia Symphony Orchestra; Igor Stravinsky (May 4, 7, 1966 – Hollywood)

Ave Maria

- Choir of the Church of the Blessed Sacrament; Igor Stravinsky (Apr. 1949 – New York)
- Festival Singers of Toronto; Igor Stravinsky (Slavonic version, May 7–8, 1964 – Toronto)

Concerto for Two Pianos

- Igor Stravinsky (pn); Soulima Stravinsky (pn) (1938 – Paris; a recording of Mozart's Fugue in C minor, K.426 was made at the same sessions)

Jeu de cartes

- Berlin Philharmonic; Igor Stravinsky (1938 – Berlin)
- Cleveland Orchestra; Igor Stravinsky (Mar. 13, 1964 – Cleveland)

Preludium

- Columbia Jazz Ensemble; Igor Stravinsky (Apr. 27, 1965 – New York)

Concerto in E-flat “Dumbarton Oaks”

- Dumbarton Oaks Festival Orchestra; Igor Stravinsky (May 28, 1947)
- Columbia Symphony Orchestra members; Igor Stravinsky (Mar. 29, 1964 – Hollywood)

Symphony in C

- Cleveland Orchestra; Igor Stravinsky (Dec. 14, 1952 – Cleveland)
- CBC Symphony Orchestra; Igor Stravinsky (Dec. 2-3, 1962 – Toronto)

Tango

- Columbia Jazz Ensemble; Igor Stravinsky (Apr. 27, 1965)

The Star-Spangled Banner (arrangement)

- CBC Symphony Orchestra; Toronto Festival Singers; Igor Stravinsky (May 8, 1964 – Toronto)

Danses concertantes

- RCA Victor Chamber Orchestra; Igor Stravinsky (1947 – Hollywood)
- Columbia Chamber Orchestra; Robert Craft (Jan. 20, 1967 – Hollywood)

Circus Polka

- Philharmonic-Symphony Orchestra of New York; Igor Stravinsky (Feb. 5, 1945 – New York)
- CBC Symphony Orchestra; Igor Stravinsky (Mar. 29, 1963 – Toronto)

Four Norwegian Moods

- Philharmonic-Symphony Orchestra of New York; Igor Stravinsky (Feb. 5, 1945 – New York)
- CBC Symphony Orchestra; Igor Stravinsky (Mar. 29, 1963 – Toronto)

Ode

- Philharmonic-Symphony Orchestra of New York; Igor Stravinsky (Feb. 5, 1945 – New York)
- Cleveland Orchestra; Igor Stravinsky (Mar. 13, 1964 – Cleveland)

Babel

- John Colicos (nar); Festival Singers of Toronto; CBC Symphony Orchestra; Igor Stravinsky (Nov. 29, 1963 – Toronto)

Scherzo à la russe

- RCA Victor Symphony Orchestra; Igor Stravinsky (1947 – Hollywood)
- Columbia Symphony Orchestra; Igor Stravinsky (Dec. 17, 1963 – New York)

Scènes de ballet

- Philharmonic-Symphony Orchestra of New York; Igor Stravinsky (Feb. 5, 1945 – New York)
- CBC Symphony Orchestra; Igor Stravinsky (Mar. 28, 1963 – Toronto)

Symphony in Three Movements

- Philharmonic-Symphony Orchestra of New York; Igor Stravinsky (Jan. 28, 1946 – New York)
- Columbia Symphony Orchestra; Igor Stravinsky (Feb. 1, 1961 – Hollywood)

Ebony Concerto

- Woody Herman (cl); and his Orchestra; Igor Stravinsky (Aug. 19, 1946 – Hollywood)
- Benny Goodman, Charles Russo, 2nd movement (cl); Columbia Jazz Ensemble; Igor Stravinsky (Apr. 27, 1965 – New York)

Concerto in D “Basle”

- RCA Victor Orchestra; Igor Stravinsky (1949 – New York)
- Columbia Symphony Orchestra; Igor Stravinsky (Dec. 17, 1963 – New York)

Orpheus

- RCA Victor Symphony Orchestra; Igor Stravinsky (Feb. 1949 – New York)
- Chicago Symphony Orchestra; Igor Stravinsky (July 20, 1964 – Chicago)

Mass

- Choir of the Church of the Blessed Sacrament; [wind ensemble]; Igor Stravinsky (Apr. 1949 – New York)
- Ferguson, Duncan, dir. 2016. Stravinsky: Choral Works. Choir of St Mary's Cathedral, Edinburgh. Delphian Records Ltd DCD34164, compact disc.
- Gregg Smith Singers; Columbia Symphony Winds & Brass; Igor Stravinsky (Jun. 9, 1960 – Hollywood)

The Rake’s Progress

- Hilde Gueden (s, Anne Truelove); Martha Lipton (m-s, Mother Goose); Blanche Thebom (m-s, Baba the Turk); Eugene Conley (t, Tom Rakewell); Paul Ranke (t, Sellem); Mack Harrell (bar, Nick Shadow); Norman Scott (b, Truelove); Lawrence Davidson (b, Keeper); Chorus & Orchestra of the Metropolitan Opera Association; Igor Stravinsky (Mar. 1, 8, 10, 1953 – New York)
- Judith Raskin (s, Anne Truelove); Jean Manning (m-s, Mother Goose); Regina Sarfaty (m-s, Baba the Turk); Alexander Young (t, Tom Rakewell); Kevin Miller (t, Sellem); John Reardon (bar, Nick Shadow); Don Garrard (b, Truelove); Peter Tracey (b, Keeper); Sadler’s Wells Opera Chorus; Royal Philharmonic Orchestra; Igor Stravinsky (Jun. 16-20, 22, 23, 1964 – London)

Cantata

- Jennie Tourel (m-s); Hugues Cuénod (t); New York Concert Choir; Philharmonic Chamber Ensemble; Igor Stravinsky (Dec. 22, 1952 – New York)
- Adrienne Albert (m-s); Alexander Young (t); Gregg Smith Singers; Columbia Chamber Ensemble; Igor Stravinsky (Nov. 27, 1965 – Hollywood)

Septet

- David Oppenheim (cl); Loren Glickman (bsn); John Barrows (hn); Alexander Schneider (vn); Karin Tuttle (va); Bernard Greenhouse (vc); Ralph Kirkpatrick (pn); Igor Stravinsky (Jan. 27, 1954 – Hollywood)
- Columbia Chamber Ensemble; Igor Stravinsky (Oct. 27, 1965 – Hollywood)

Three Songs from Shakespeare

- Grace-Lynn Martin (s); Arthur Gleghorn (fl); Hugo Raimondi (cl); Cecil Figelski (va); Igor Stravinsky (Sept. 13, 1954 – Hollywood)
- Cathy Berberian (m-s); Columbia Chamber Ensemble; Igor Stravinsky (Dec. 14, 1964 – New York)

Four Russian Songs (arr. for voice, flute, harp and guitar)

- Marni Nixon (s); Arthur Gleghorn (fl); Dorothy Remsen (h); Jack Marshall (g); Igor Stravinsky (July 28, 1955 – Hollywood)
- Adrienne Albert (m-s); Louise de Tullio (fl); Dorothy Remsen (h); Laurindo Almeida (g); Igor Stravinsky (Nov. 30, 1965 – Hollywood)

In Memoriam Dylan Thomas

- Richard Robinson (t); Lloyd Ulyate, Hoyt Bohannon, Francis Howard, Seymour Zeldin (tbn); Israel Baker, Sol Babitz (vn); Cecil Figelski (va); George Neikrug (vc); Igor Stravinsky (Sept. 13, 1954 – Hollywood)
- Alexander Young (t); Columbia Chamber Ensemble; Igor Stravinsky (Nov. 27, 1965 – Hollywood)

Greeting Prelude

- Columbia Symphony Orchestra; Igor Stravinsky (Dec. 17, 1963 – New York)

Canticum Sacrum

- Richard Robinson (t); Howard Chitjian (bar); Los Angeles Festival Choir & Symphony Orchestra; Igor Stravinsky (Jun. 19, 1957 – Los Angeles)

Agon

- Los Angeles Festival Symphony Orchestra; Igor Stravinsky (Jun. 18, 1957 – Los Angeles)

Threni

- Bethany Beardslee (s); Beatrice Krebs (a); William Lewis, James Wainner (t); Mac Morgan (bar); Robert Oliver (b); Schola Cantorum; Columbia Symphony Orchestra; Igor Stravinsky (Jan. 5-6, 1959 – New York)

Movements for Piano and Orchestra

- Charles Rosen (pn); Columbia Symphony Orchestra; Igor Stravinsky (Feb. 12, 1961 – Hollywood)

Epitaphium

- Arthur Gleghorn (fl); Kalman Bloch (cl); Dorothy Remsen (h); Robert Craft (Dec. 14, 1964 – New York)

Double Canon

- Israel Baker, Otis Igleman (vn); Sanford Schonbach (va); George Neikrug (vc); Robert Craft (Jan. 25, 1961 – Hollywood)

A Sermon, a Narrative and a Prayer

- John Horton (nar); Shirley Verrett (m-s); Loren Driscoll (t); Festival Singers of Toronto; CBC Symphony Orchestra; Igor Stravinsky (Apr. 29, 1962 – Toronto)

Anthem: The dove descending breaks the air

- Festival Singers of Toronto; Igor Stravinsky (Apr. 29, 1962 – Toronto)

8 Instrumental Miniatures

- CBC Symphony Orchestra; Igor Stravinsky (Apr. 29, 1962 – Toronto)

The Flood

- Laurence Harvey (nar); Sebastian Cabot, Elsa Lanchester, Paul Tripp (actors); Richard Robinson (t); John Reardon, Robert Oliver (b); Columbia Symphony Chorus & Orchestra; Robert Craft (Mar. 28, 31, 1962 – Hollywood)

Elegy for J.F.K.

- Cathy Berberian (m-s); Paul Howland, Jack Kreiselman, Charles Russo (cl); Igor Stravinsky (Dec. 14, 1964 – New York)

Fanfare for a New Theatre

- Robert Heinrich, Robert E. Nagel (tpt); Igor Stravinsky (Dec. 11, 1964 – New York)

Abraham and Isaac

- Richard Frisch (bar); Columbia Symphony Orchestra; Robert Craft (Jan. 24, 1967; July 11, 1969 – Hollywood)

Variations: Aldous Huxley in memoriam

- Columbia Symphony Orchestra; Robert Craft (Oct. 11, 1966 – Hollywood)

Introitus

- Gregg Smith Singers; Columbia Chamber Ensemble; Igor Stravinsky (Feb. 9, 1966 – New York)

Requiem Canticles

- Soloists; Ithaca College Concert Choir; Columbia Symphony Orchestra; Robert Craft (Oct. 11, 1966 – New York)

The Owl and the Pussycat

- Adrienne Albert (m-s); Robert Craft (pn) (Aug. 18, 1967 – Hollywood)
