= Lagunen-Walzer =

Lagunen-Walzer (Lagoon-Waltz) op. 411 is a waltz by Johann Strauss II written in 1883. The waltz melodies are drawn from his operetta Eine Nacht in Venedig (A Night in Venice) which was a fiasco when premiered in Berlin on 3 October 1883.

The waltz's primary melody was from the Act 3 song by the character Duke of Urbino. The Berlin production incorporated many outrageously silly lyrics during this waltz song where the singer has to sing the embarrassing 'Nacht sind die Katzen ja grau, nachts tönt es zärtlich Miau!' (At night, the cats are grey, at night "meow" they tenderly say!').

Without further ado, for the hurried Vienna premiere, the tempo was reduced and the words were replaced with the more agreeable 'Ach, wie so herrlich zu schaun, sind all' die lieblichen Frau'n!' (Oh, how splendid to see, all of these lovely ladies!).

Eduard Strauss first performed the orchestral work on 4 November 1883 in the Golden Hall (Goldener-Saal) of the Vienna Musikverein, site of the modern day Neujahrskonzert.

In 1921, Arnold Schoenberg produced a chamber arrangement for the Society for Private Musical Performances in Vienna.
