= Pribaoutki =

1914 cycle of four songs composed by Igor Stravinsky

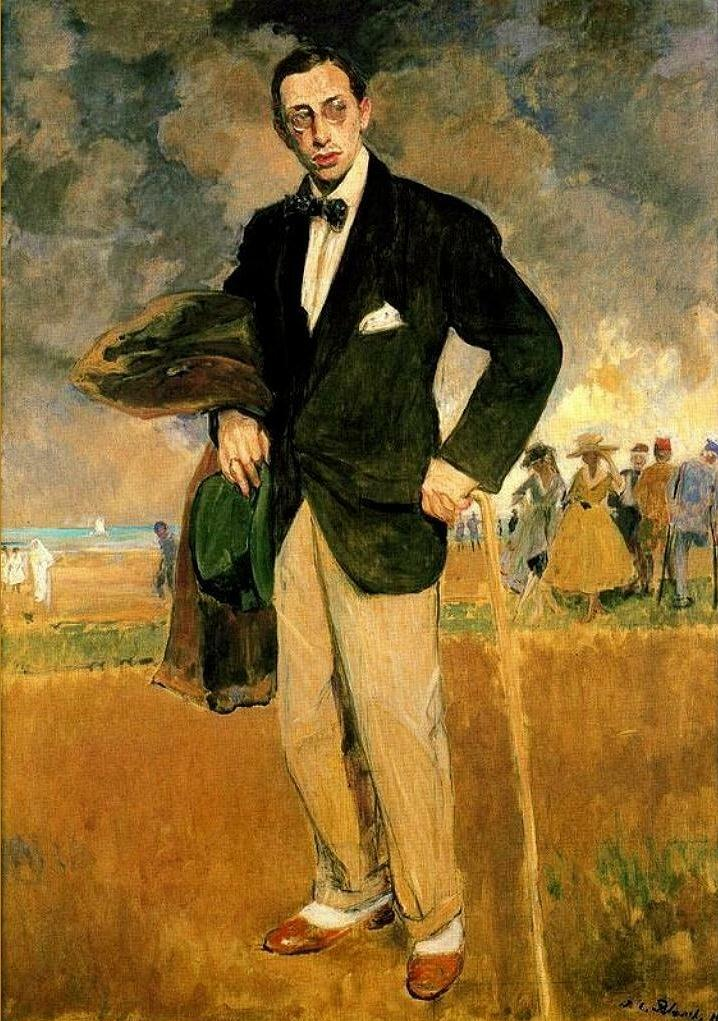
Portrait of Igor Stravinsky by Jacques-Émile Blanche (1915)

Pribaoutki (Russian: Прибаутки) is a cycle of four songs composed by Igor Stravinsky in 1914 to Russian texts by Alexander Afanasyev. Its Russian title has no direct English equivalent, although Richard Taruskin suggests "nonsense rhymes" or "jingles." (The French subtitle appearing in the score, Chansons plaisantes, is descriptive, not a translation.) Pribaoutki takes about four minutes to perform.

== Songs ==
The titles of the four songs are:

1. "Kornílo" ("Uncle Kornilo")
2. "Natashka" ("Little Natalie")
3. "Polkovnik" ("The Colonel")
4. "Starets i zayats" ("The Old Man and the Hare")

== Instrumentation ==
Pribaoutki is written for low voice and instrumental ensemble. Stravinsky is said to have preferred a male singer, although the work is commonly performed by mezzo-soprano or contralto. The eight-member ensemble consists of: flute, oboe (doubling English horn), clarinet, bassoon, violin, viola, cello, and double bass.

== History ==
Pribaoutki was composed between June and September 1914, just as World War I was breaking out. During this time, Stravinsky was living in Switzerland: at Salvan during the summer, and Clarens in September.

== Premières ==
Pribaoutki was first heard in London (Aeolian Hall) with members of the London String Quartet and Olga Haley under the direction of Eugène Goossens on February 22, 1918. This predates the Paris premiere (Salle des Agriculteurs) on November 20, 1918, in a program that also included the Berceuses du chat; both works were accompanied by piano in this performance. The first Viennese performance with instrumental ensemble was given on June 6, 1919, at a concert of Arnold Schoenberg's Society for Private Musical Performances (Verein für musikalische Privataufführungen). Again, the program also included the Berceuses du chat.
