= Allerheiligen-Hofkirche =

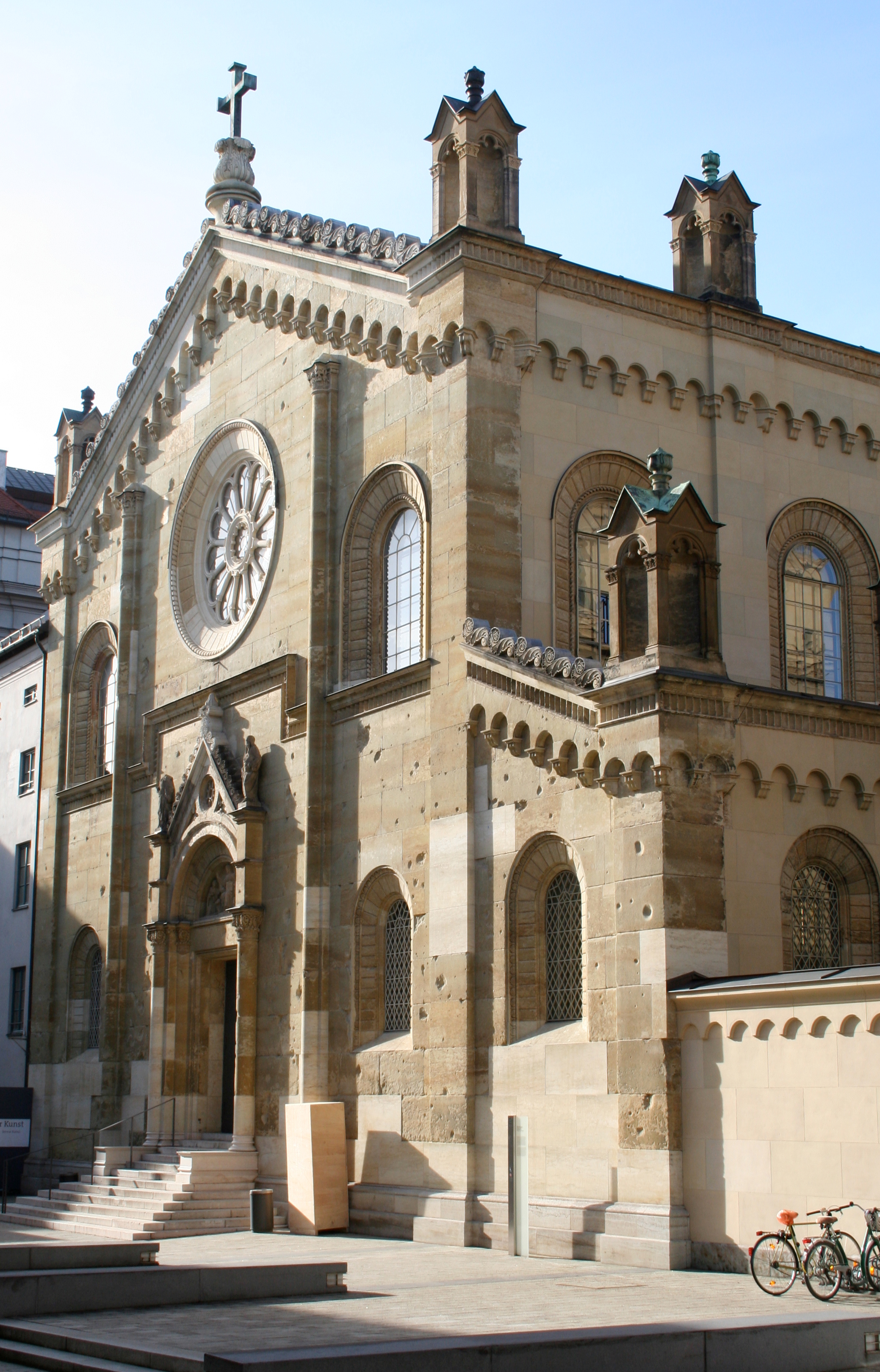
- Allerheiligen-Hofkirche
- Allerheiligen-Hofkirche
- 48.1411°N 11.5802°E
- Address: Residenzstraße 1 Munich, Germany
- Country: Germany
- Denomination: Catholic

Architecture
- Architect: Leo von Klenze
- Years built: 1826–1837

The Allerheiligen-Hofkirche (Court Church of All Saints) is a Catholic church in the Munich Residenz designed by Leo von Klenze and built between 1826 and 1837.

The church was badly damaged from bombing during World War II and for decades remained a ruin before undergoing partial restoration and secularization. It is now used for concerts and events.

== History ==
The Allerheiligen-Hofkirche was commissioned in 1825 by Ludwig I of Bavaria, inspired by the Cappella Palatina, the richly decorated Byzantine royal chapel in Palermo, where he had attended Christmas mass in 1823. The commission marked a reversal of the policy of secularisation, carried out under his father Maximilian I at the beginning of the century. Leo von Klenze (1784–1864) produced various designs between 1826 and 1828, using not only the Capella Palatina, but also St Mark's in Venice as inspiration. Even before a design had been agreed there had been a ceremonial laying of the foundation stone in 1826; and the church was completed and dedicated on October 29, 1837.

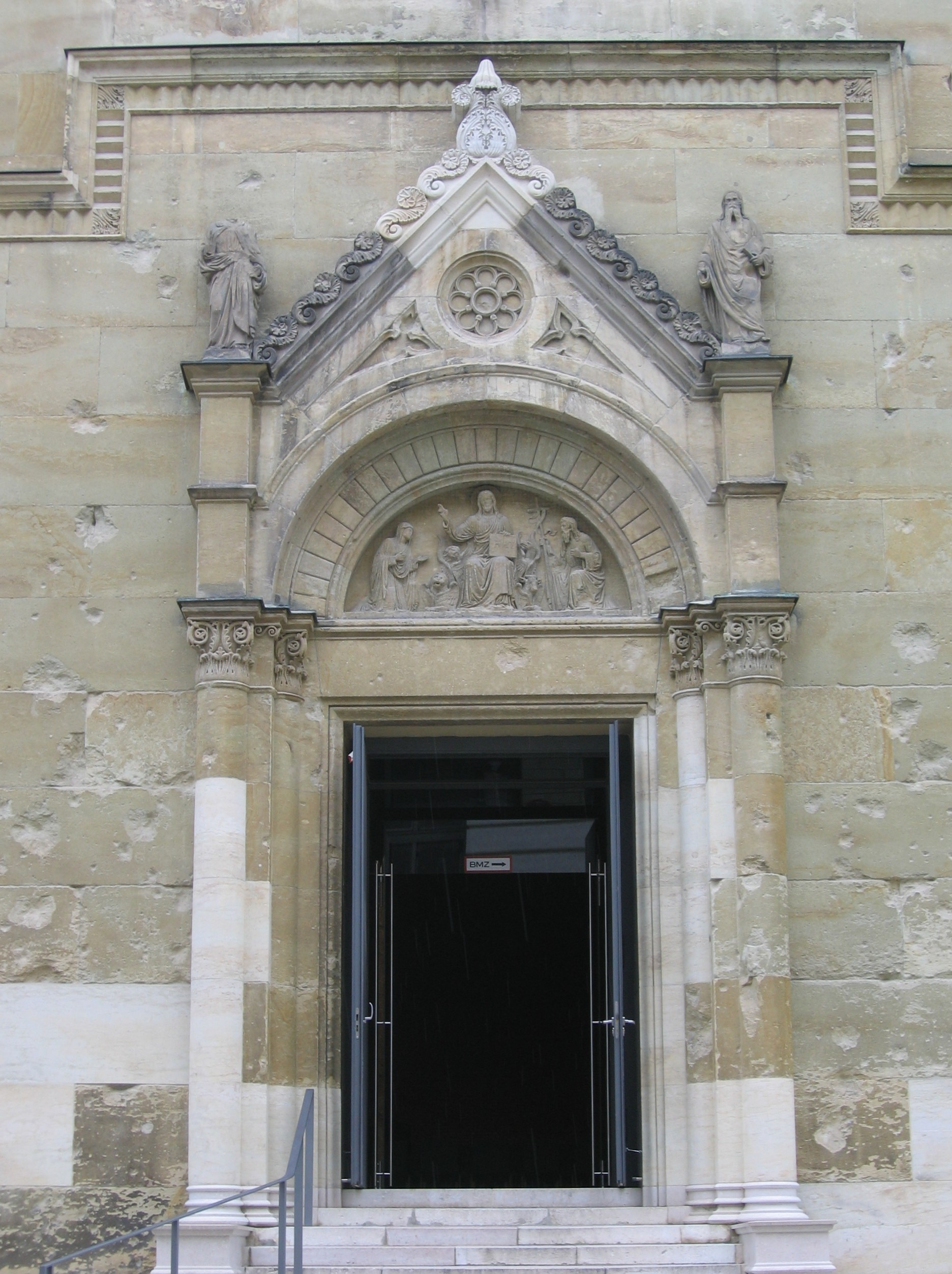
Portal

The church was designed with a private entrance for the king from within the Residence. The public entrance faced east, towards the Marstallplatz. Above the doorway a deesis sculpted in relief is framed by a gothic wimperg, with statues of Saint Peter and Saint Paul on either side. Inside, the nave is made up of two domes and an apse, each separated by an arch of brickwork. These, like the columns that separated the side aisles and supported the gallery, were originally richly ornamented. Heinrich Maria von Hess, with various assistants, created frescoes on a gold background: the first dome had Old Testament scenes, the second Christ and the apostles, with the four evangelists in the four pendentives, and the apse showed the Trinity above a figure of Mary.

On April 25, 1944, bombs destroyed all but the outer walls. The rich interior ornament was almost completely lost. Although other parts of the Residence were restored soon after the war, the ruined church was left to deteriorate for many years. In 1986 the decision was made to restore it. The restoration was completed in 2003, together with the recreation of an enclosed garden, the Kabinettsgarten, on its north side. No attempt was made to recreate the original ornament in the restored building, which instead in its simplicity shows the architectural qualities of Klenze's design. It is now used for concerts and events, within the limits of respecting its former character as a church. It is a regular concert venue for the ensemble Taschenphilharmonie.
