= Taschenphilharmonie =

German orchestra

- Chamber ensemble
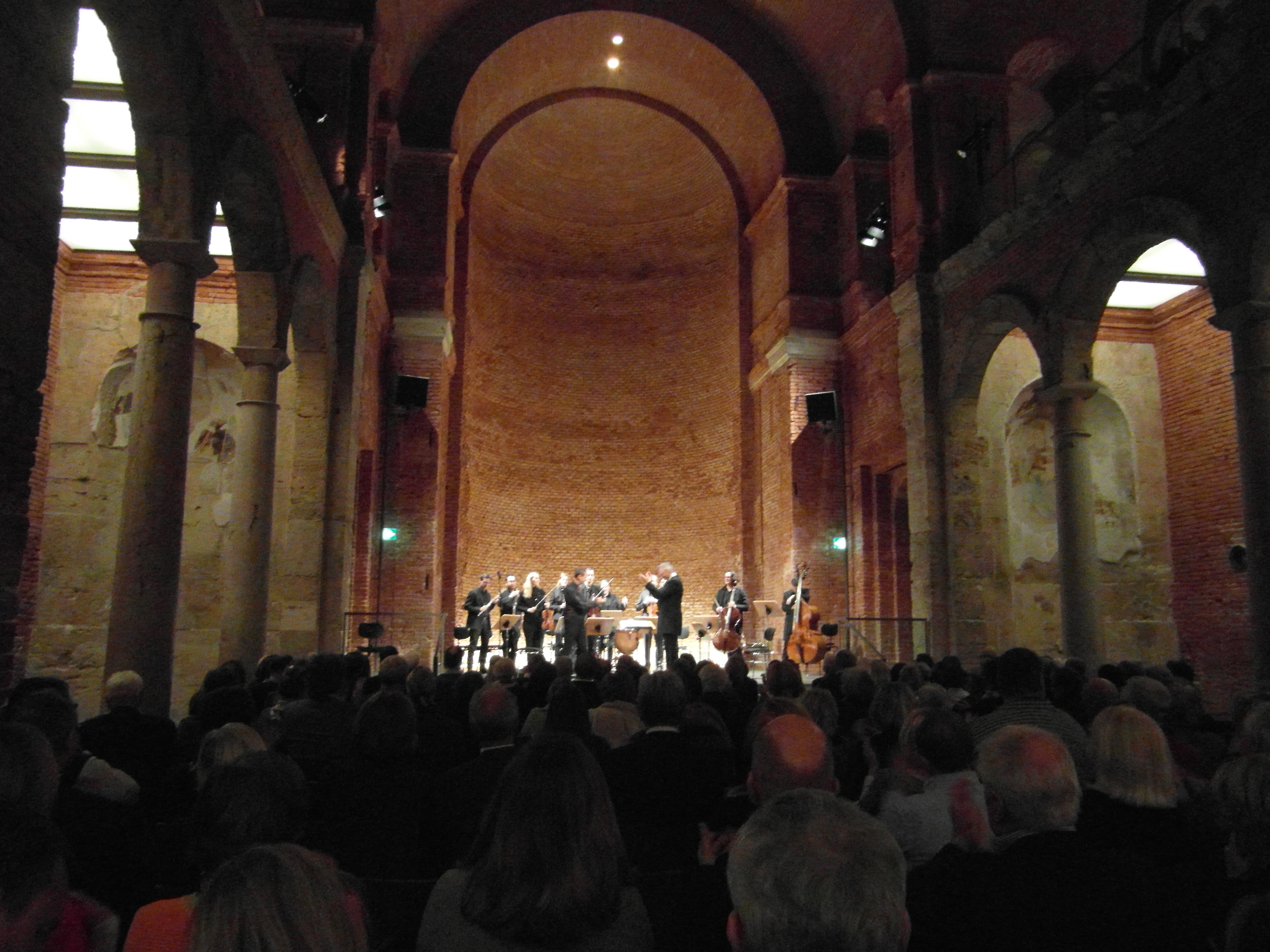
- The ensemble at the Allerheiligen-Hofkirche with composer Graham Waterhouse (left) and conductor Peter Stangel on 20 November 2016
- Founded: 2005
- Location: Munich, Germany
- Principal conductor: Peter Stangel
- Website: die-taschenphilharmonie.de

Taschenphilharmonie (Pocket philharmonic) is a German orchestra, founded in 2005 by Peter Stangel. The chamber ensemble plays symphonic works in three series, with most concerts held at the Allerheiligen-Hofkirche of the Munich Residenz. In addition to concerts which juxtapose classical and contemporary music, they address children in a second series and listeners interested in the making of a composition in a third. The ensemble styles its name die taschenphilharmonie.

== History and program ==
The ensemble continues a tradition that Arnold Schönberg began in Vienna in 1918: the Verein für musikalische Privataufführungen played chamber versions of orchestral works. The format has been compared to the Taschenbuch (paperback, lit.: pocket book). The ensemble has been called "das kleinste Sinfonieorchester der Welt" (the world's smallest orchestra).

One concert series of the Taschenphilharmonie is called Abenteuer für die Ohren (Adventure for the ears), combining works by two or three composers, usually contrasting classical and contemporary. A concert on 20 November contrasted Beethoven's 2nd symphony with Jan Václav Voříšek's Symphony in D and a work by Graham Waterhouse, whose Concerto da camera they had premiered in 1911. Another premiere was =11= by Alexander Strauch, played at the Black Box of the Gasteig. The ensemble performed works such as Wilhelm Killmayer's Sinfonia 2 on the occasion of the composer's 80th birthday in 2007, Wilfried Hiller's Hamelin in 2008, Stravinsky's Concerto in E-flat "Dumbarton Oaks" in 2009, Kurt Weill's Second Symphony in 2010, and Schoenberg's A Survivor from Warsaw in 2015.

A second series addresses children age four to nine. Große Musik für kleine Hörer (Great music for small listeners) introduces classical music to children focusing on a single composer, with the presentation of the music being embedded in a story with Stangel as the narrator. Concerts are also played at kindergartens and schools. The 2016 season began with a concert on Humperdinck's Hänsel und Gretel. The concerts reach about thousand children per year in live concerts. The series was awarded the Leopold in 2011, Ein Sommernachtstraum was in the Bestenliste (List of the best) of the Preis der deutschen Schallplattenkritik in 2013

A third series is called Hörakademie (Listening academy), offering background information for one work with sound examples before intermission, the complete work afterwards. In 2010, the topic were Mahler's Rückert-Lieder, performed with the baritone Wolfgang Wirsching at the Kleiner Konzertsaal of the Gasteig. On 3 March 2016 they analysed and played Mendelssohn's Italian Symphony, on 27 November 2016 Beethoven's 2nd symphony is explored. The series is organized in collaboration with the Munich Volkshochschule and the Hochschule für Musik und Theater München. It was transferred to the Künstlerhaus in the Lenbachhaus beginning in 2016.

== Publications ==
- Große Musik für kleine Hörer, an edition of 13 CDs in collaboration with Die Zeit and SONY classical, including
  - Ein Sommernachtstraum, reading with music. ISBN 978-3-8445-1002-7
  - Die vier Jahreszeiten, reading with music. ISBN 978-3-8445-1001-0
  - Peer Gynt, reading with music. ISBN 978-3-8445-1135-2
  - Hänsel und Gretel, reading with music. ISBN 978-3-8445-1134-5
  - Eine musikalische Schlittenfahrt. Vom Englein, das nicht singen konnte, reading, with music by Peter Stangel, Georg Simm, Leopold Mozart. ISBN 978-3-86717-987-4.
- Mahler: Lieder eines fahrenden Gesellen (Susan Maclean, mezzo-soprano) and Symphony No. 4 (Hélène Lindqvist, soprano)
- Mahler: Symphony No. 7, version for chamber ensemble, world premiere recording
- Peter Stangel: Oboe und Co oder Was macht das Horn im Wald: Die Instrumente stellen sich vor. ISBN 978-3938822326

== Awards ==
- 2011 Leopold for Große Musik für kleine Hörer
- 2013 Preis der deutschen Schallplattenkritik for Sommernachtstraum
