= Hans Grüß =

German musicologist and musician

Hans Ludwig Kurt Reinhold Grüß (4 March 1929 – 24 November 2001) was a German musicologist and ensemble leader.

== Life ==
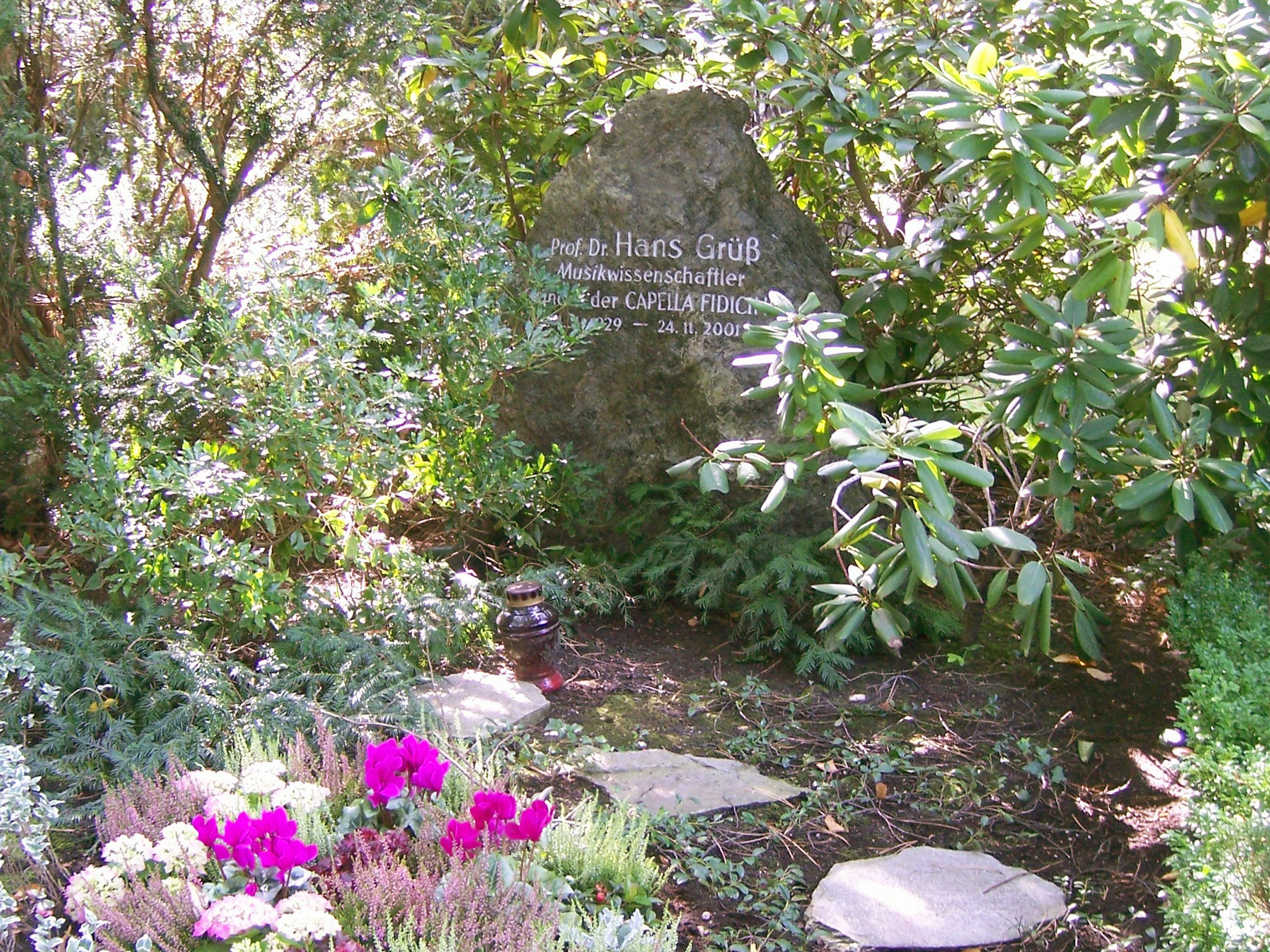
Hans Grüß' gravesite at Südfriedhof in Leipzig

=== Childhood and studies ===
He spent his childhood and adolescence in Freiberg since his father taught as professor of mathematics and technical mechanics at the Bergakademie Freiberg from 1936. As a grammar school student he was drafted to the Volkssturm and was only able to take his Abitur after he had been a prisoner of war.

First he studied German language and literature, musicology and pedagogy at the Humboldt University of Berlin from 1947, and from 1949 at the Leipzig University and the Musikhochschule. Early on, he became interested in performance practice of early music and received his doctorate in 1956 with a work on Josquin des Prez.

=== Professional activity ===
In 1957 Grüß was given a lectureship at the University of Leipzig. Because of political disagreements he was threatened with the withdrawal of his teaching license by the SED in 1963. It was only after the political change in 1993 that he was appointed extraordinary professor and taught until 1996. As a sought-after specialist, he continued to hold lectureships at the Technical University of Dresden and at the Leipzig Academy of Music after his retirement.

=== Ensemble leader ===
In 1957 he founded the Capella Fidicinia, an ensemble consisting of members of the Leipzig Institute for Musicology, which was dedicated to the faithful performance of early music. They played on historical instruments of the Museum of Musical Instruments of Leipzig University, whereby Grüß played the viol. For larger performances Grüß and his ensemble regularly received support from musicians of the Gewandhausorchester and the MDR Leipzig Radio Symphony Orchestra. A particularly close collaboration existed with the Dresdner Kreuzchor and the soloists Winfried Schrammek (organ), Peter Schreier and Martin Krumbiegel, who has led the ensemble since the death of its founder.

Grüß died in Much at the age of 72.

== Honours ==
- Ehrennadel der Karl-Marx-Universität Leipzig, 1984
- Kunstpreis der Stadt Leipzig, 1985
- Ordinary member of the Sächsische Akademie der Wissenschaften, 1995

== Literature ==
- Hans Grüß: Ansichtssachen, Verlag Kamprad, Altenburg 1999. ISBN 978-3-930550-07-4
- Winfried Schrammek: Magister und Musicus. Hans Grüß zum Gedenken, Leipzig 2005.

== Recordings ==
- Ockeghem/Obrecht "Missa L'Homme armé" Capella Fidicinia, Thomanerchor Leipzig, Hans Grüß querstand
