= Helmut Kirchmeyer =

German musicologist and historian

Helmut Kirchmeyer 2005

Helmut Franz Maria Kirchmeyer (born 30 June 1930) is a German musicologist, philologist and historian.

== Career ==
Kirchmeyer was born in Düsseldorf. After grammar school, he studied musicology, German literature and philosophy at the University of Cologne, where he presented what is probably the first thesis in Germany on a living composer, Igor Stravinsky, in 1954. He then studied legal affairs, concentrating on medieval law and legal history, criminology and sociology in Cologne and church history at the University of Bonn.

Starting in 1947 he attended classes at the Robert-Schumann-Institut in Düsseldorf (whose director he became in 1972), Franzpeter Goebels (piano) and Jürg Baur (composition) were among his teachers, later Bernd Alois Zimmermann introduced him to instrumentation.

In 1982 he qualified as a university lecturer on musicology and musicological media studies at the University of Düsseldorf, he taught musicological bibliography and history at the Institut für Fachbibliographie in Cologne, and musicology at RWTH Aachen University, at the Rheinische Musikschule in Cologne, at the university and at the Robert Schumann Hochschule in Düsseldorf, at the latter he founded the first musicological institute at a German college of music, whose first head he became.

For years he worked as a critic; he worked for GEMA, edited the Instrumentenbau-Zeitschrift, developed programmes for the Westdeutscher Rundfunk. He founded the Düsseldorf College of Music. In 1962 he initiated and developed the record label and series on classic and contemporary German music WERGO, together with German art historian Werner Goldschmidt (1903–1975), hence the name: Wer[ner] Go[ldschmidt]. He also founded Ars Gregoriana, containing the largest documentation of Gregorian chant (more than 500 pieces on 33 LP/CD).

He supported contemporary music and was in touch with many contemporary composers. Herbert Eimert, the founder of the first electronic studio who died in 1972, bequeathed his letters (about 400) to him.

During his time at the Robert Schumann Hochschule, the Partika-Saal for orchestra rehearsals and chamber concerts was built there, which was awarded the title "exemplary artistic building". The crypt below it was decorated by Emil Schult, and Karlheinz Stockhausen composed the piece 50 Klangbilder as musical illustration of Schult's work.

== Private life ==
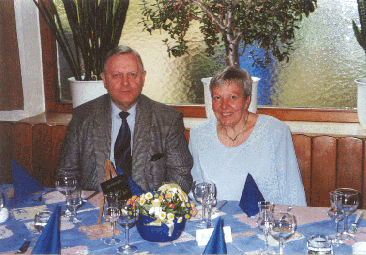
Helmut Kirchmeyer and his wife Eva in Darmstadt, 2005

Kirchmeyer married Eva Maria Berke in 1966. They have four children and five grandchildren. In 2020, Kirchmeyer and his wife established the Kirchmeyer Family Foundation that consists of a collection of non-European instruments, about 200 exhibits from Africa, Asia and Australia, that was put together by the Kirchmeyer family over the course of several decades and is now on display at the Ausbildungskorps der Bundeswehr in Hilden.

== Awards ==
Kirchmeyer has received the following medals and awards:

- Richard-Wagner-Medal, 1975
- Germany's Federal Cross of Merit, 1985
- Knight of the Papal Ordo Sancti Gregorii Magni, 1995
- Germany's Federal Officer's Cross of Merit, 1998
- German Federal Armed Forces Cross of Merit in Gold, 2006

In 1992 Kirchmeyer was appointed Corresponding Member of the Saxonian Academy of Sciences in Leipzig, Germany.

== Methods ==
Kirchmeyer's studies are strongly influenced by bibliographical, legal and philological approaches, and by the thoughts of music ethnographer Marius Schneider, Kant and Jaspers.

For the first time in German musicology, Kirchmeyer used newspapers and journals as sources for establishing what he calls "Situationsgeschichte", a mosaic picture of the past by combining contemporary evaluations of minute events with almost criminological assessment of their relative reliability. The thus established historical picture enables understanding of musical history as a sequence of minute historical-cultural situations and protects historical events as well as pieces of art from distorting (polemic or apologetic) approaches.

Kirchmeyer's books on Stravinsky (1958) and Wagner (1972) were highly successful. In the former he connected monographical and biographical elements to form a new type of "ergography", which in 2002 he systematically followed up in his bibliography of the works of Stravinsky. Since its publication, Kirchmeyer has been working on his documentary on Wagner criticism again and he has begun to write his memoirs.

== Selected bibliography ==
=== Books ===
- Igor Strawinsky: Zeitgeschichte im Persönlichkeitsbild: Grundlagen und Voraussetzungen zur modernen Konstruktionstechnik (Kölner Beiträge zur Musikforschung 10). Regensburg: Bosse-Verlag, 1958.
- Liturgie am Scheideweg: Betrachtungen zur Situation der Katholischen Kirchenmusik aus Anlass des Kölner Kongresses. Regensburg: Gustav Bosse–Verlag, 1962.
- Aufbruch der Jungen Musik: Von Webern bis Stockhausen (Die Garbe: Musikkunde 4), sixth edition. Cologne: Gerig-Verlag, 1979. ISBN 3872520245.
- Quellentexte zur System- und Methodengeschichte der deutschen Musikkritik 1791–1833. Regensburg: Bosse-Verlag, 1990.
- Robert Schumanns Düsseldorfer Aufsatz "Neue Bahnen" und die Ausbreitung der Wagnerschen Opern bis 1856: Psychogramm eines "letzten" Artikels (Abhandlungen der Sächsischen Akademie der Wissenschaften zu Leipzig, Philologisch-historische Klasse 73, no. 6). Berlin: Akademie-Verlag, 1993. ISBN 3050024577.
- Kleine Monographie über Herbert Eimert (Abhandlungen der Sächsischen Akademie der Wissenschaften zu Leipzig, Philologisch-Historische Klasse 75, no. 6). Leipzig: Verlag der Sächsischen Akademie der Wissenschaften zu Leipzig; Stuttgart: Hirzel-Verlag, 1998. ISBN 3777609250.
- Kommentiertes Verzeichnis der Werke und Werkausgaben Igor Strawinskys bis 1971 (Abhandlungen der Sächsischen Akademie der Wissenschaften zu Leipzig, Philologisch-Historische Klasse 79). Stuttgart: Hirzel-Verlag; Leipzig: Verlag der Sächsischen Akademie der Wissenschaften zu Leipzig, 2002. ISBN 3777611565.
- Hugo Balzer - Eine Gedenkschrift aus Anlass seines 25. Todestages in Verbindung mit einer Studie zum Thema Künstler im Nationalsozialismus. Stuttgart: Franz Steiner Verlag, 2012. ISBN 978-3-515-10182-0.
- System- und Methodengeschichte der deutschen Musikkritik vom Ausgang des 18. bis zum Beginn des 20. Jahrhunderts. Supplement to the Archiv für Musikwissenschaft (AFMW-B) Band 78. Stuttgart: Franz Steiner Verlag, 2017. ISBN 978-3-515-11726-5.
- Der Eimert-Nachlass. BoD Verlag Norderstedt, 2022. ISBN 978-3-756-25769-0.

=== Publications ===
- Ars Gregoriana. Dokumentationen zu den gregorianischen Formen und Feiern unter der künstlerischen Leitung von Karlheinz Hodes

- (Grundreihe 1–18: Einführung in den Gregorianischen Choral [Doppelplatte], Tractus, Graduale, Alleluia, Antiphon, Responsorium / Prozessionsgesänge, Introitus, Communio, Offertorium, Kyrie, Gloria, Credo / Kantillationen, Sanctus / Agnus Dei, Hymnus, Tropus, Sequenz, Reimoffizium, Litanei / Passion;
- Supplementreihe I–XII: Martinsmesse, 3 Weihnachtsmessen [Dreierplatte], Stephanusmesse, Ostermesse, Pfingstmesse, Marienmesse, Totenmesse, Mariendonker Marien-Offizium [5 Platten: Erste Vesper / Komplet I, Matutin, Messe, Laudes / Mittagshore Sext, Zweite Vesper / Komplet II];
- Appendixreihe A–C: Ergänzungsplatte Justus ut palma, Brautmesse, Friedensmesse) mit ausführlichem Begleit-, Noten-, Text- (lateinisch-deutsch) und Informationsmaterial, mit ausgewählten mittelalterlichen Quellentexten (lateinisch/griechisch-deutsch) und wissenschaftlichen Begleitaufsätzen (Schallplattenausgabe) bzw. viersprachigem (lateinisch, deutsch, französisch, englisch) Textheft (CD-Ausgabe), Motette Ursina Verlag Düsseldorf (Schallplattenausgabe 1985 bis 1995; CD-Ausgabe seit 1992ff.), see also: Winfried Schrammek: "Zur Ars gregoriana von Helmut Kirchmeyer", in Arbeitsblätter der Kommission für Kunstgeschichte, Literatur- und Musikwissenschaft der Sächsischen Akademie der Wissenschaften zu Leipzig, Nr. 10.
