= Hugo Balzer =

German conductor (1894–1985)

Hugo Philipp Balzer (17 April 1894 – 3 April 1985) was a German conductor.

== Life ==
Born in Meiderich, Balzer studied at the conservatories in Duisburg and Cologne. He initially worked as a conductor in Koblenz and Essen. In 1929 he went to Freiburg im Breisgau as Generalmusikdirektor and in 1933 to Düsseldorf in the same position. In 1934 he was involved in the foundation and in January 1935 in the ceremonial opening of the Robert Schumann Conservatory. In 1939 he was appointed professor at this institution; In addition he was given the direction of the teaching institution. From 1946 Balzer was a guest conductor in opera and concerts, mainly in Romance language-speaking countries (Spain, Italy, Brazil), where he reactivated earlier contacts. During his time in Düsseldorf he led several world premieres of operas such as Gerster's Enoch Arden and Die Hexe von Passau.

== Assessment ==
Balzer had to organize the Reichsmusiktage for the National Socialists. They tried to develop Düsseldorf into their music capital, which was not realized. Balzer was able to make musical life in Düsseldorf largely neutral, although he could not prevent the Degenerate music exhibition. As director of the Düsseldorfer Symphoniker, "Balzer pursued an opportunistic programme policy, and the orchestra was the central orchestral body at the Reichmusiktage 1938 and 1939." Helmut Kirchmeyer, one of Balzer's successors as director of the Düsseldorf Music Academy, "recognizes Balzer as a person who tries in every conceivable way to survive the political reality of a blood dictatorship as unscathed as possible, to get past his own time and to do good within the scope of his possibilities".
