= WERGO =

Record label

Wergo
- Founded: 1962
- Founder: Werner Goldschmidt; Helmut Kirchmeyer
- Genre: Contemporary classical
- Country of origin: Germany
- Location: Mainz
- Official website: en.schott-music.com/wergo/

Wergo is a German record label focusing on contemporary classical music. It was founded in 1962 by German art historian and music publisher Werner Goldschmidt (1903–1975) and the musicologist Helmut Kirchmeyer. Their first release, filed under "WER 60001", was Schoenberg's Pierrot lunaire, conducted by Pierre Boulez. The record company is owned by Schott Music, both based in Mainz, Germany.

A great number of contemporary composers have been recorded by the label. These include Louis Andriessen, George Antheil, Béla Bartók, Pierre Boulez, Earle Brown, John Cage, Elliott Carter, George Crumb, Morton Feldman, Mauricio Kagel, György Ligeti, Meredith Monk, Conlon Nancarrow, Luigi Nono, Harry Partch, Steve Reich, Wolfgang Rihm, Terry Riley, Kaija Saariaho, Giacinto Scelsi, Dieter Schnebel, Karlheinz Stockhausen, Pēteris Vasks, and Walter Zimmermann.

Earle Brown was repertory director of an important series of new-music recordings on the Time-Mainstream label re-issued in 2008 on Wergo. Between 1960 and 1973, Brown oversaw the label's recordings of works by 49 composers from 16 countries, among them Ives, Cage, Nono, Maderna, Stockhausen, Berio and Xenakis.

The label began releasing LPs but now releases CDs and DVDs. As of 2012, the catalogue consists of about 600 different albums published in numerous series that are often edited in cooperation with institutions prominent in promotion of contemporary classical music (i.e. Deutscher Musikrat, Westdeutscher Rundfunk in Cologne, Center for Art and Media Karlsruhe (ZKM) Karlsruhe).

== WERGO re-releases on CD ==
Earle Brown's Contemporary Sound Series:

- Earle Brown – A Life in Music – Vol. 1 – 3 CDs
- Earle Brown – A Life in Music – Vol. 2 – 3 CDs
- Earle Brown – A Life in Music – Vol. 3 – 3 CDs
- Earle Brown – A Life in Music – Vol. 4 – 3 CDs
- Earle Brown – A Life in Music – Vol. 5 – 3 CDs
- Earle Brown – A Life in Music – Vol. 6 – 3 CDs
