= Kammeroper Frankfurt =

German opera company

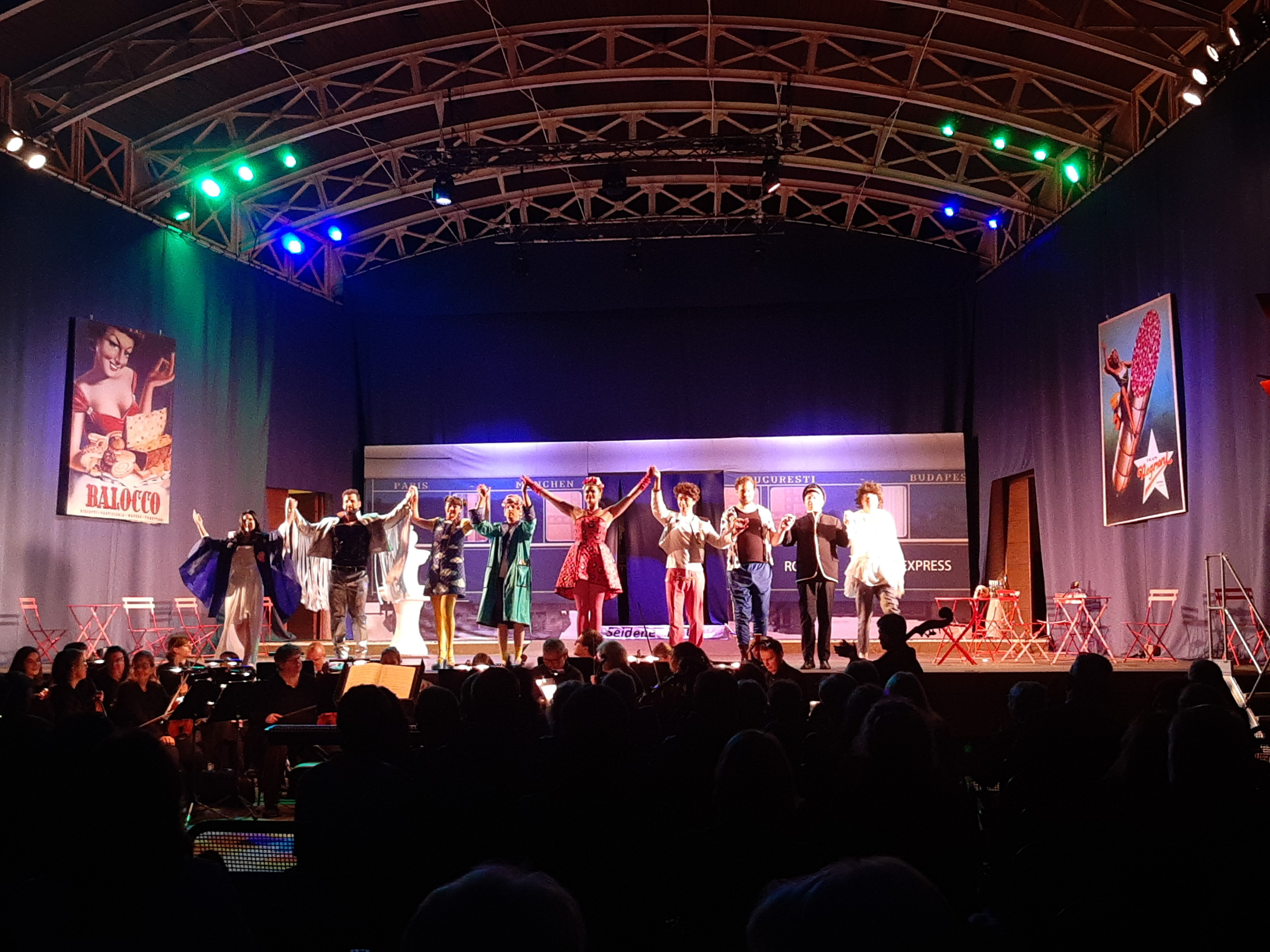
- Rossini: La scala di seta, in 2023
- Formation: 1982
- Location: Frankfurt, Germany
- Leader: Rainer Pudenz
- Website: www.kammeroper-frankfurt.de

The Kammeroper Frankfurt (Frankfurt Chamber Opera) is an unattached opera ensemble in Frankfurt, Hesse, Germany, founded in 1982 by its director Rainer Pudenz. The company plays at various venues. The regular conductor is Daniel Stratievsky.

== History ==
After working as an assistant director at theatres in Freiburg, Stuttgart and Essen, Pudenz founded the Kammeroper in 1982, first directing Telemann's Pimpinone which he directed at a Frankfurt school. The hallmarks of Kammeroper productions are the use of satirical-comical devices and "unconventional, uninhibited music theatre far removed from stiff stage dogma" In order to break down threshold fears and make it possible to experience opera as a Gesamtkunstwerk of language and music, Kammeroper Frankfurt performs all operas in German in the tradition of Walter Felsenstein, which has since become a unique selling point in the local opera landscape. The performances are meant to open up to the audience "an artful-sensual experience, an immediate access and pleasurable experiences with these musical works of art." The Kammeroper has put on more than 80 productions since its foundation, including world premieres, as of 2010. In 2019, Julija Domaševa was the first woman to conduct there, in Rossini's L'equivoco stravagante.

== Productions ==
One focus of the productions at the Kammeroper is on opera buffa as influenced by Mozart, Rossini, Donizetti and Bizet. Occasionally, light-hearted fare such as singspiel and operettas by Offenbach and Lehár has been presented. More recently, the repertoire was extended by dramatic operas such as Verdi's Rigoletto, classical-modern works such as Stravinski's L'Histoire du soldat, and, in the spirit of discovery, commissioned compositions by the composer-in-residence Andrea Cavalleri. The Kammeroper has premiered four of his works, including La strada della vita (based on the Fellini film La strada) and a newly composed version of Winterreise. As a rule, two to three productions appear each year, including a major production in the summer.

== Ensemble ==
As an independent opera house, the Kammeroper has no permanent ensemble, but a core of singers who have performed regularly, such as sopranos Ingrid El Sigai, Dzuna Kalnina and Petra Woisetschläger, and the bass Bernd Kaiser. From the very beginning, costume designer Magarete Berghoff has also been part of the core of the chamber opera. Her pop-surreal designs have had a decisive influence on the style of the productions and their public perception. Many young artists began their career at the Kammeroper and moved on to houses such as the Vienna State Opera, the Graz Opera House and the Komische Oper Berlin. The large summer productions involve an average of around 60 to 70 performers. The more intimate winter/spring productions come to the stage with 10–15 performers.

== Frankfurt venues and guest performances ==
The Frankfurt Chamber Opera has no fixed venue, even though the major summer productions are firmly established as open-air performances in Frankfurt's Palmengarten. Since its founding, the Kammeroper has sought venues that make use of the genius loci for the opera in question. These have included, for example, the hall of the Finkenhof, the Naxoshalle, the Künstlerhaus Mousonturm, the Unitarische Weihehalle and the Cantate Hall. In total, their productions have been shown at over 20 different venues in Frankfurt. In addition, the Kammeroper has given guest performances in Germany and abroad, including at the Rockefeller Foundation Bellagio, the Walkenried Abbey, the Heidelberg Castle ruines, the Stiftsruine Bad Hersfeld, the Teatro della Compagnia and the National Museum Barghello in Florence. the Theater am Ebertplatz in Oberhausen and the Schloss Wilhelmsbad in Hanau.

It has been planned for some time to build a permanent home for the Kammeroper in the Sachsenhäuser Fabrik, with a foundation set up for this purpose.

== Cooperation projects ==
The Kammeroper Frankfurt collaborates with other institutions such as in 2013 with Theater Willy Praml for the project "Passion.Easter" at the Naxoshalle. In the process, Willy Praml's Jesus d'amour was merged with Poulenc's monodrama La voix humaine and a string quartet by Cavallari, composed especially for this production. Another focus of the cooperative activities is to inspire children and young people for opera, performing at schools. A 2011 cooperation with the Kinderzeit-Schule in Schwalbach and a 2015/16 cooperation with the Albrecht Strohschein School in Oberursel both focused on Mozart's Die Zauberflöte.
