= Lev Razumovsky =

Russian painter

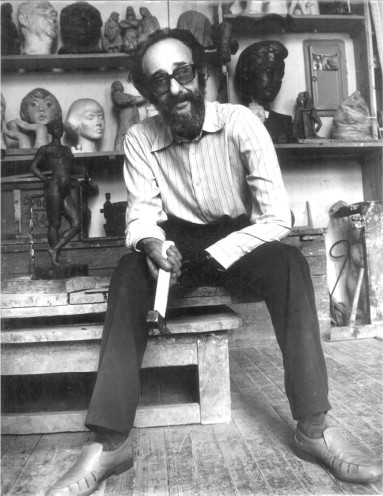
- Lev Razumovsky in his studio, 1986
- Born: 1 May 1926; Leningrad, USSR
- Died: 20 January 2006; Saint Petersburg, Russia
- Website: https://lev-razumovsky.org/en/

Lev Razumovsky (1926 – 2006) was a Russian sculptor, painter, graphic artist, medal and toy designer, and writer.

== Biography ==
Lev Razumovsky was born in Leningrad, USSR on May 1, 1926.

He survived the Siege of Leningrad. In 1943, aged 17, he was drafted to the army, was seriously wounded in a battle near Petrozavodsk losing his left arm.

In 1945, despite his disability, he entered the Leningrad College of Art and Design (now the Saint Petersburg Art and Industry Academy) to become a sculptor.

First of all, I sincerely wanted to be a sculptor. Second, I loved it. And third, I had a secret, most important task. I didn't tell anyone about it but it was the leitmotiv of my life. I wanted to prove to other people, and above all to myself, that I was not a disabled person. I wanted to prove that I could do any job in art, the most difficult jobs, physically, in all arts. And, little by little, eventually I did.

His diploma work, the Pilot (cast bronze, 1953), was installed in Victory Park in Leningrad, now St. Petersburg.

In 1955, Razumovsky was admitted to the Union of Artists of Russia. In sculpture, he worked in various genres: monuments, park sculpture, portraits, compositions, small-size sculpture, and medals. War and the Holocaust were major themes in his work. Five sculptures by Lev Razumovsky have been acquired by the Russian Museum in St. Petersburg.

Bulat Okudzhava wrote a letter to Lev Razumovsky about his sculpture composition "The Roads of War" (1980):

Today, the tone of talking about the war is too buoyant and rollicking in films, radio and television programmes, which I find sickening. Therefore it would be a good idea to show your works everywhere in order to bring down an excessive triumphant excitement.

(Note: Okudzhava, Bulat. "letter". Maria Razumovskaya.)

Lev Razumovsky was a professional toy designer: his toys were produced in large quantities by toy factories of Leningrad and Moscow.

He took part in numerous exhibitions – local, national and international.

His works are displayed in Russian museums and in private collections in Russia, Finland, Sweden, Denmark, the Netherlands, Germany, Hungary, Israel, and the US.

His memoirs about the siege and the army were published in the 1990s. He has also written about 100 short stories.

In 1997, a video was made by Alexander Gref where Lev demonstrates self-invented devices helping one-armed people to manage in everyday life without having to ask someone for help. Initially, this video was meant as an aid for disabled people. In 2011, it was used for a short documentary Life of Full Value.

Andrew Bernhardt, London:

He had a choice, a bigger one that most of us ever have to make: whether to be a victim of his times, his body and his limitations or go beyond all that to find out the talented, determined human being within. He did it. The rest of us shouldn't be silenced by envy or admiration but motivated to action. Never easy but, as he shows so eloquently, we are capable of so much more than we allow ourselves to dream.

== Works ==
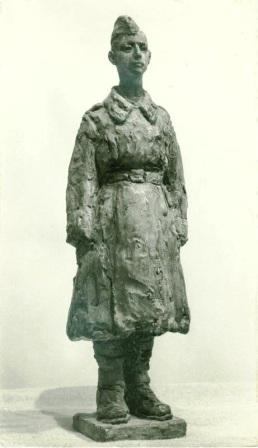
Self portrait. 1943. The sculpture was made in 1955 in memory of the author's participation in World War 2.

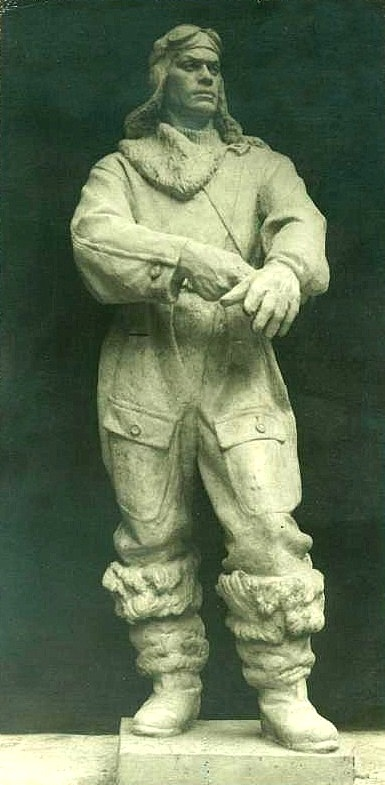
Pilot. Diploma work, 1953. The statue is in Victory Park, St. Petersburg

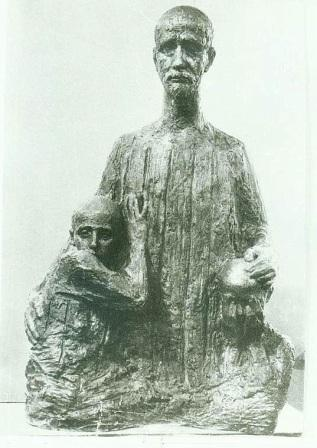
Janusz Korczak. 1986. The sculpture was given by the author to the St. Petersburg Society of the Holocaust Survivors.

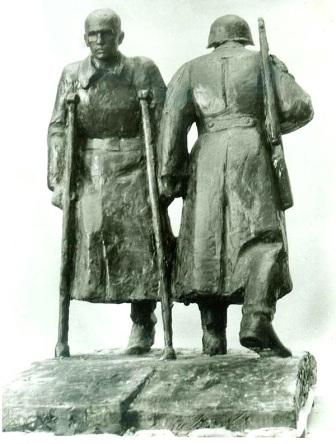
The Roads of War. 1980. The sculpture was given by the author to the Museum of the Siege of Leningrad, St. Petersburg

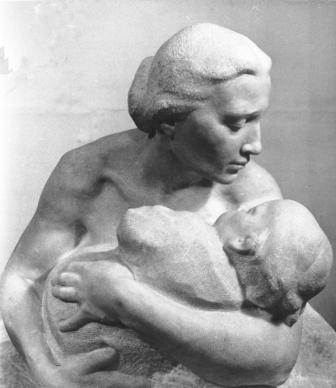
Mother and Child. Marble. 1960. The sculpture is in the Novosibirsk Picture Gallery.

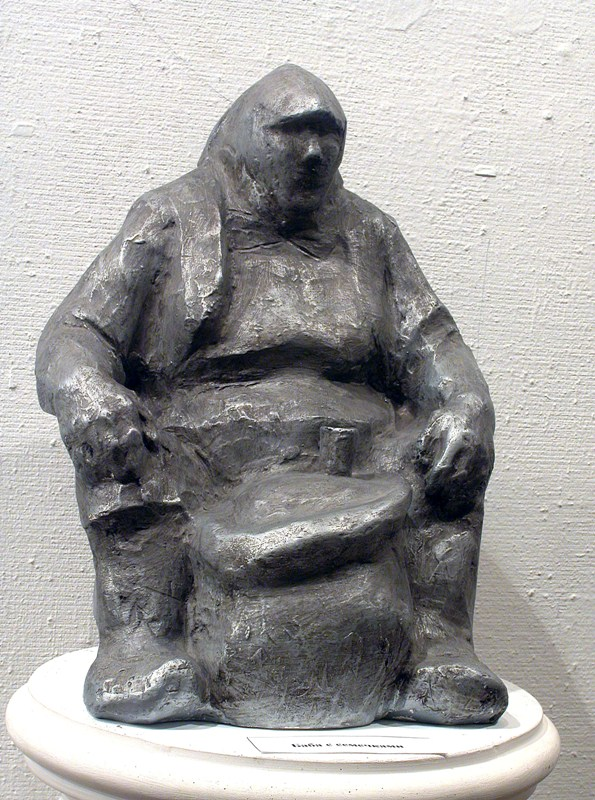
Woman Selling Sunflower Seeds. 1968. The sculpture is at the Russian Museum, St Petersburg.

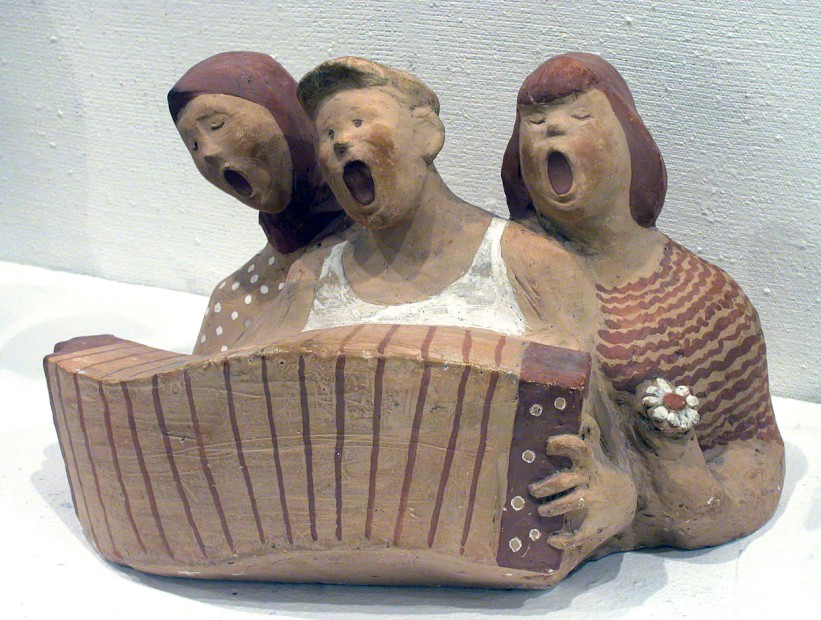
Folk Singers from Yaroslavl. 1965

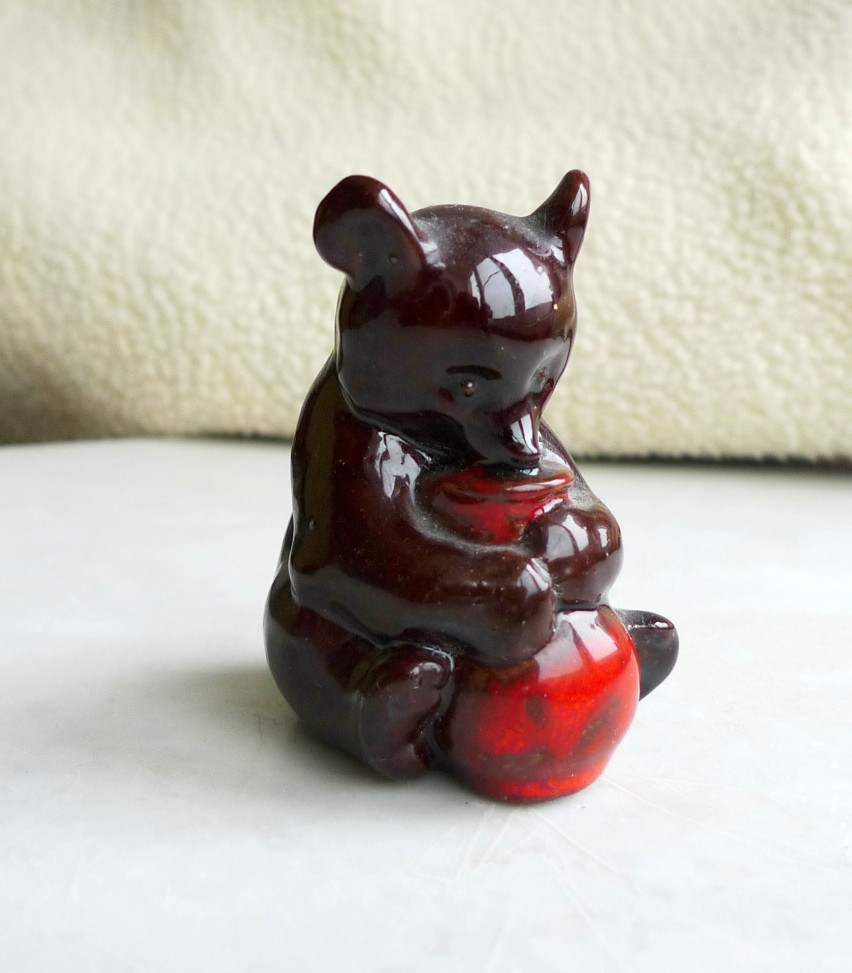
Gourmand. Ceramics

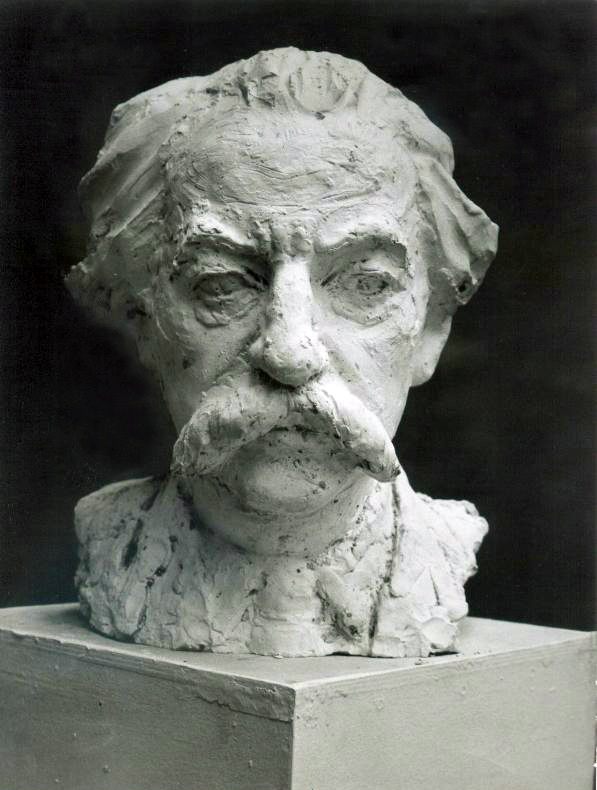
Portrait of Yuri Lotman, Russian literary scholar. 1980

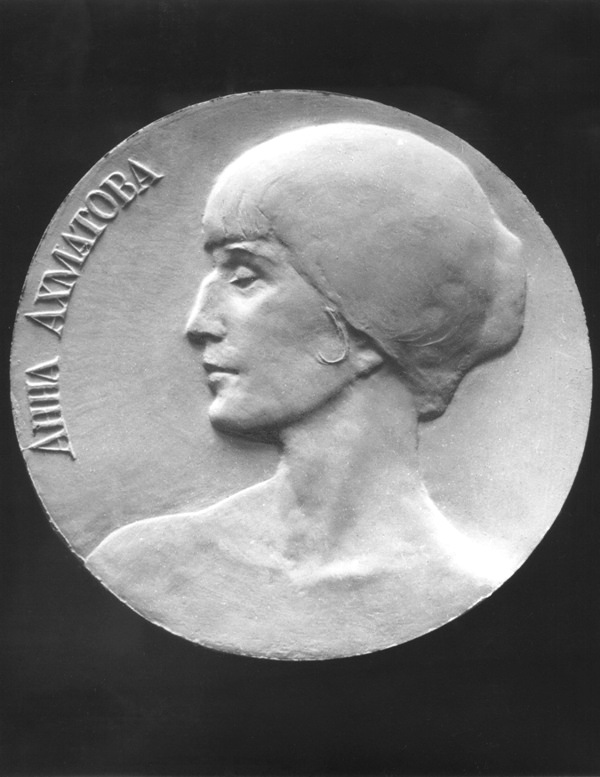
Anna Akhmatova. Medal

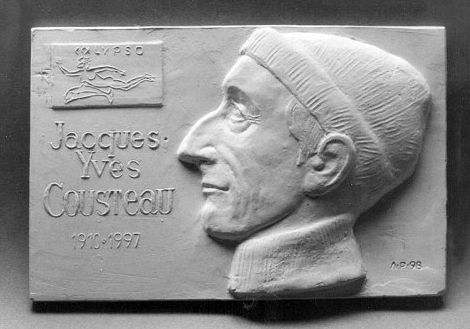
Jacques-Yves Cousteau. Bas-relief

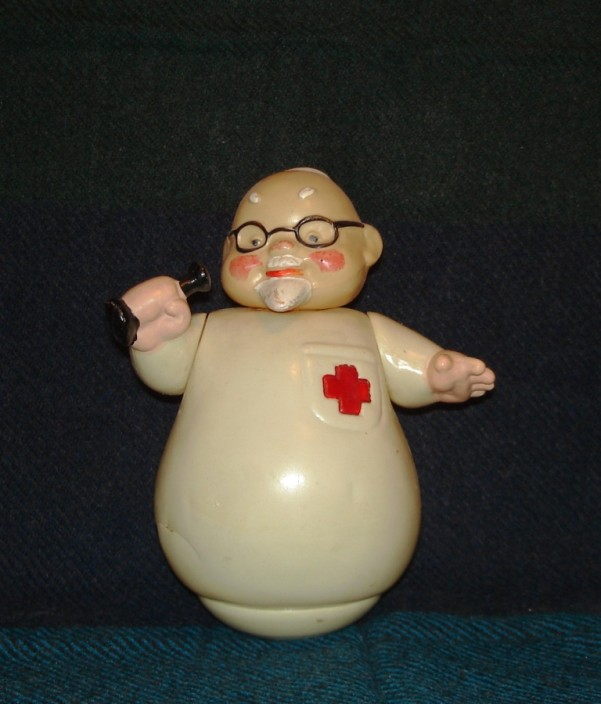
Aibolit (Doctor Dolittle). Toy

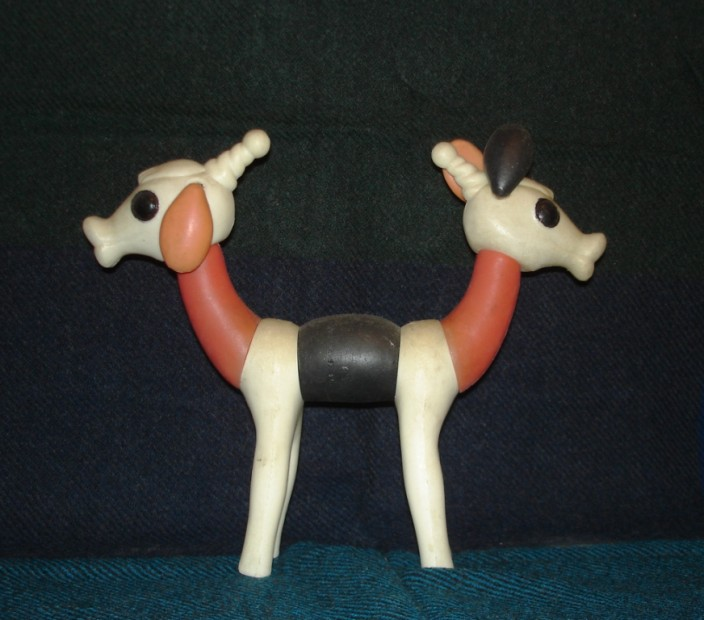
Tianitolkai (Pushmi-pullyu). Toy

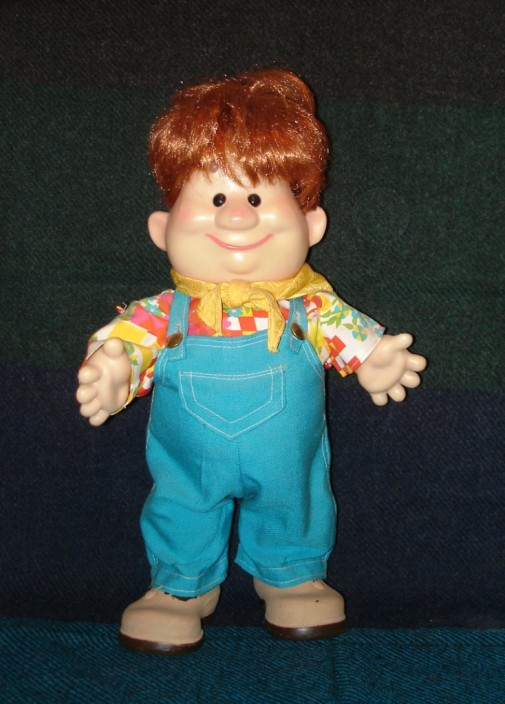
Karlsson. Toy

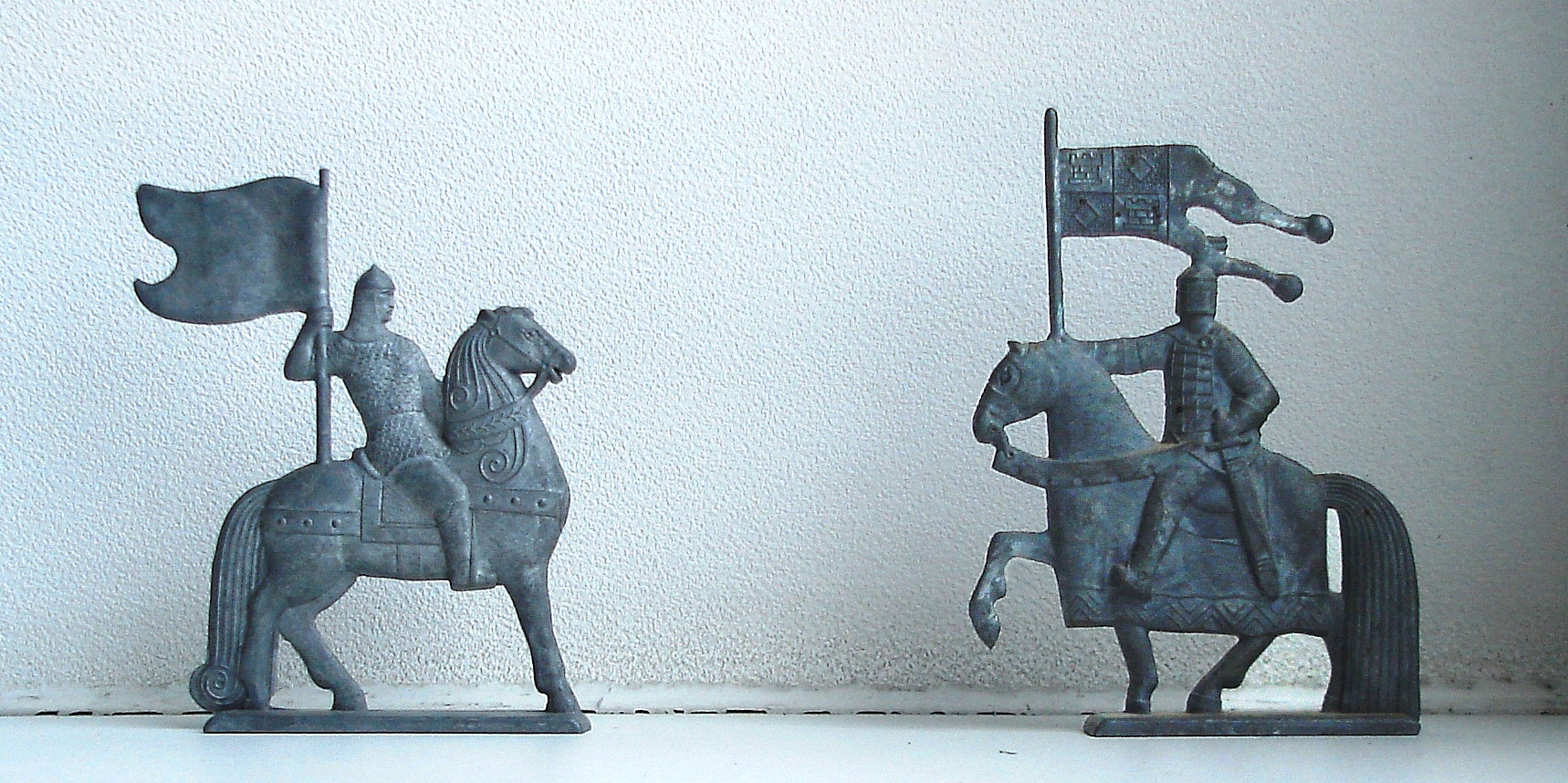
The Battle On The Ice. 1972. The set of toy soldiers consists of 14 figures of the historic Battle On the Ice of 1242 between the Republic of Novgorod and Teutonic Knights.

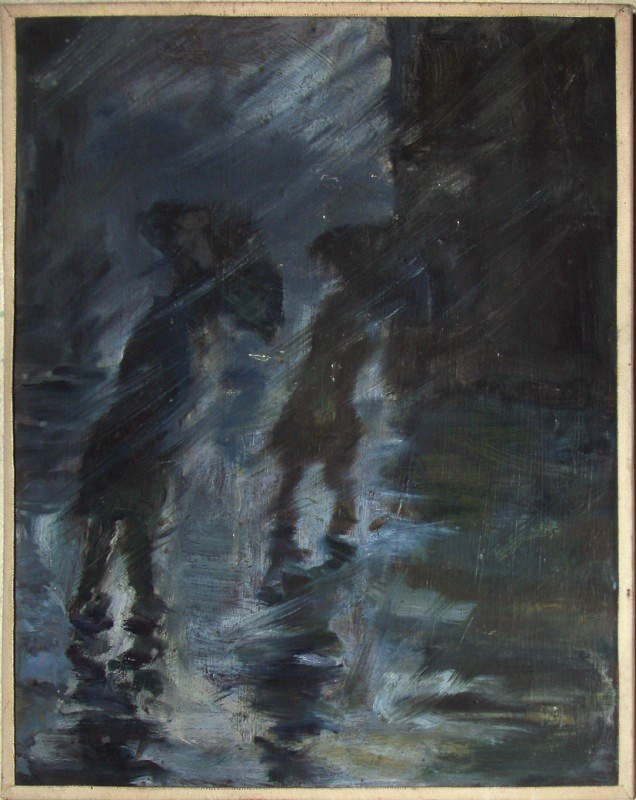
Rain. Oil painting

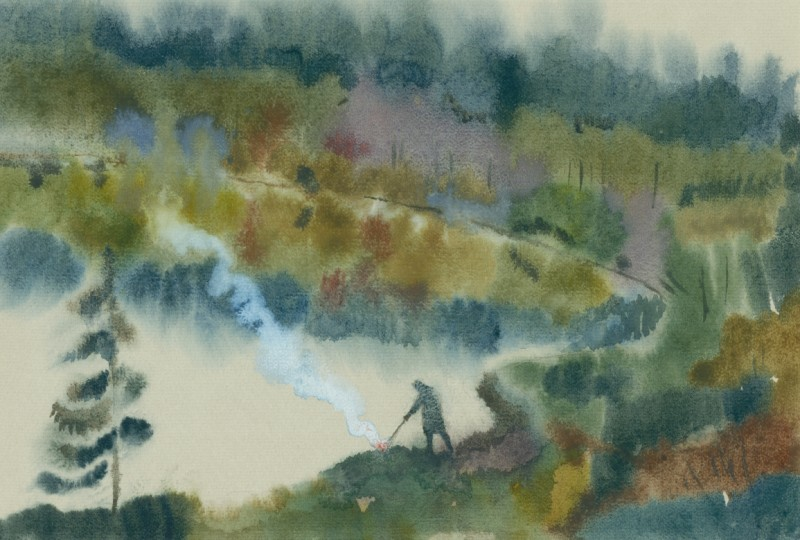
By the Fire. Watercolour. 1980

== Bibliography ==
- Нас время учило // Нева, 1995, № 11-12 (in Russian) We Learned from the Times. War memoirs. The Neva magazine No. 11-12, 1995.
- Дети блокады // Нева, 1999, № 1 (in Russian) Children of the Siege. Memoirs. The Neva magazine No. 9, 1999.
- Памяти Володи Татаровича // Крещатик, 2002, № 15 (in Russian) In Memory of Volodya Tatarovich. The Kreschatik magazine No. 15, 2002.
- Паренек из Великих Лук // Нева, 2004, № 9 (in Russian) The Chap from Velikie Luki. The Neva magazine No. 9, 2004. (Note: Razumovsky, Lev (2004). Neva. 9: 277–283.)
- Моя коллекция (in Russian) My Collection. Short stories.
