= Winfried Schrammek =

German musicologist and organist

Winfried Schrammek (7 June 1929 – 4 March 2017) was a German musicologist and organist.

== Life ==
=== Education ===
Born in Breslau, Schrammek, son of a surveying engineer, received his first organ lessons as a pupil of the Herzog-Friedland-Gymnasium in Żagań by his music teacher Gustav Mikeleitis. At the age of 15 he was called up for military service. After the end of the war he and his parents were expelled from the Silesian homeland. In Jena he passed his high school diploma in 1948 and began a two-year study of church music at the Hochschule für Musik Franz Liszt, Weimar, which he completed with the Mittlere Staatliche Prüfung für Kirchenmusiker. He then studied musicology, German studies and ethnology at the University of Jena until 1953. . After a three-year aspirancy at the University of Jena, he received his doctorate there in 1956 under Heinrich Besseler. His dissertation topic was: Das deutsche Lied in den deutschen Orgel tablatures des 15. Jahrhunderts unter besonderer Berücksichtigung des Buxheimer Orgelbuches.

=== Academic activity ===
From 1956 to 1962 Schrammek was a research assistant in the music department at the Institute for Folk Art Research in Leipzig. During this time he edited folk song editions and worked in field research on the Harz folklore, here especially about the Birkenblattblase. Fruits of this work were the series Volkslieder aus deutschen Landschaften published by Friedrich Hofmeister Musikverlag under his direction and other publications on the customs in the Harz.

In 1962 he began his professional career as a research assistant at the Museum of Musical Instruments of Leipzig University. In 1977 he was appointed as curator, in 1988 as provisional director and in 1989 as director of this museum. During this time, he devoted himself to all museological work and participated in over 50 special exhibitions. He specialized in keyboard instruments, especially the organ and the harpsichord.

From 1965 to 1990 he was a member of the Council for Museums at the GDR Ministry of Culture.

Schrammek conducted extensive scientific research on the history of the organ. He was particularly interested in the Central German organ landscape. In this area he was a proven expert for all questions of construction, performance practice and liturgy. As such, he was instrumental in the rescue and restoration of numerous historical organs in Saxony, Saxony-Anhalt and Thuringia.

On 27 May 1968, under conspiratorial circumstances, he led the rescue of the small organ from the Leipzig Paulinerkirche, which had already been prepared for demolition.

In 1993 he was appointed to the commission "Art History, Literature and Musicology" of the Saxon Academy of Sciences and in 1994 he was appointed extraordinary professor.

After his retirement in 1995, Schrammek was visiting scholar at the Leipzig University until 2006 and worked as a lecturer until 2011 for the Military bands of the Bundeswehr in Hilden. Since 2004, he was a member of the university rectorate commission "Organ for the new construction of the assembly hall/church on the campus Augustusplatz", whose concept he significantly influenced.

=== Church music ===
In addition to his professional activities, Winfried Schrammek was organist and choirmaster at the Catholic Church St. Bonifatius. Until 1990 he belonged to a Collegium musicum, the "Chorus Cantorum", which was exclusively dedicated to the research and faithful performance of the Gregorian chant. In concerts he was particularly prominent as an interpreter of medieval organ and clavichord music. A close collaboration existed with Hans Grüß and his Capella Fidicinia. As an organist and expert, he also participated in numerous recordings for radio and CD.

Schrammek died in Leipzig at age 86 and was buried in the University Rebates of the II Department of the Leipzig Südfriedfriedhof, not far from the grave of his teacher Heinrich Besseler.

== Honours ==
- 1999: Leipziger Universitätsmedaille
- 1999: Bundesverdienstkreuz 1. Klasse

== Publications ==
=== Books ===
- Über Ursprung und Anfänge der Musik. Breitkopf & Härtel, Leipzig 1957.
- Musikinstrumente. Photos R. Langematz. Prisma-Verlag, Leipzig 1970.
- Museum Musicum. Photos S. and V. Herre. Edition Peters, Leipzig 1981, Literature by and about Winfried Schrammek in the German National Library catalogue.
- Bach-Orgeln in Thüringen und Sachsen. Nationale Forschungs- und Gedenkstätten Joh.Seb.Bachs, Leipzig 1984.
- With Klaus Gernhardt and Hubertus Henkel: Orgelinstrumente, Harmoniums. In Katalog des Musikinstrumenten-Museums. Vol. 6, Deutscher Verlag für Musik, Leipzig 1983.
- Magister und Musicus. Hans Grüß zum Gedenken. Leipzig University 2005.
- Über das Jodeln im Harz. Wernigerode 2005.

=== Articles ===
- Die mg. Stellung der Orgeltriosonaten von J. S. Bach. In Bach Jahrbuch 1954, pp. 7–28.
- Birkenblattblasen. In Festschrift Heinrich Besseler. Leipzig 1961, pp. 7–14.
- Die Geschichte des sogenannten Harzspruchs vom Mittelalter bis zur Gegenwart. In Journal of the International Folk Music Council. 13, 1961, pp. 50–53.
- Die Ausbildung von Musikinstrumenten-Restauratoren im Musikinstrumenten-Museum in der Karl-Marx-Universität Leipzig. In Neue Museumskunde. 12, 1969, pp. 98–105.
- Johann Sebastian Bach, Gottfried Silbermann und die französische Orgelkunst. In Bach-Studien. 5, Leipzig 1975, pp. 93–107
- Viola Pomposa und Violoncello piccolo bei Johann Sebastian Bach. In Kongressbericht Bachfest Leipzig 1975. Leipzig 1977, pp. 345–354.
- Versuch über Johann Sebastian Bachs Vorstellung von Orgelbau, Orgeldisposition und Orgelregistrierung. In: Bach-Studien. 7, Leipzig 1982, pp. 192–211.
- Zur Geschichte der großen Orgel in der Thomaskirche zu Leipzig von 1601–1885. In Beiträge zur Bachforschung. 2, Leipzig 1983, pp. 46–55.
- Die Viola d’amore zur Zeit Johann Sebastian Bachs. In Bach-Studien. 9, Leipzig 1986, S. 56–66.
- Orgel, Positiv, Clavicymbel und Glocken der Schloßkirche zu Weimar 1658 bis 1774. In Kongressbericht Bachfest Leipzig 1985. Leipzig 1988, pp. 99–111.
- Über den Wert von Musikinstrumenten. In Arbeitsblatt Nr. 2 der Sächsischen Akademie der Wissenschaften. Leipzig 1998, pp. 25–31.
- Gregorianischer Choral zur Zeit der zweiten Jahrtausendwende – Betrachtungen anläßlich der Ars Gregoriana von Helmut Kirchmeyer. In Arbeitsblatt Nr. 16/I der Sächsischen Akademie der Wissenschaften. Leipzig 2000, pp. 5–19.
- Musen – Museum – Musica. In Theatrum Instrumentorum Dresdense. Schneverdingen 2003, pp. 27–35.
- Sämtliche Artikel über Musikinstrumente und Instrumentenbauer in 7 verschiedenen Ausgaben von Meyers Lexikon. Leipzig 1968–1980.
- Sämtliche Artikel über Musikinstrumente und Instrumentenbauer sowie über musikalisch-liturgische Begriffe im Lexikon der Renaissance. Leipzig 1989.

=== Editions ===
- With K. Fiedler, P. Nedo, K. Petermann: Volkslieder aus deutschen Landschaften. 7 volumes: Obersachsen (1958), Harz (1957), Hessen (1958), Thüringen (1959), Sachsen-Anhalt (1958) Lausitzer Sorben (1960), Mecklenburg (1960).

== Literature ==
- Winfried Schrammek. In Die Musik in Geschichte und Gegenwart (MGG), Metzler-Verlag, volume 15, 2006, ISBN 3-476-41022-6, p. 27.
