= Schatz-Walzer =

1885 Viennese waltz by Johann Strauss II

Schatz-Walzer ("Treasure Waltz"), Op. 418, is a Viennese waltz by Johann Strauss II composed in 1885. The melodies in this waltz were drawn from Strauss' operetta Der Zigeunerbaron ("The Gypsy Baron"), which premiered to critical acclaim on 24 October 1885. Der Zigeunerbaron, a Hungarian-influenced work, remained Strauss' best-remembered operetta after Die Fledermaus. The waltz version was first performed on 22 November that year in the concert hall of the Vienna Musikverein, with Eduard Strauss conducting.

Strauss often presented music from his operettas as new and independent orchestral works, following the example of fellow operetta composer Jacques Offenbach. Offenbach frequently performed the overture of a new stage work before the premiere of the work, which exposed the music to a wider audience and promoted the sales of piano transcriptions of it (sheet music).

The first waltz theme is from the Act II finale aria "So voll Fröhlichkeit" ("So full of happiness"). The waltz also includes the melody of the Act II trio "Ha, seht es winkt, es blinkt, es klingt" ("See it beckon, it gleam, it clink"), in which the title character Sandor Barinkay and his gypsy friends Saffi and Czipra celebrate finding a hidden treasure in his estate (thus the title of the waltz).

The work begins in C major, in a march-like tune ("Du kannst den Zigeunern getrost vertrau'n") before the "So voll Fröhlichkeit" first waltz section melodies enter. The first part of the second waltz section is the trio ("Ha, seht es winkt, es blinkt, es klingt"), which is followed by the second part ("Nun will ich des Lebens mich freuen") in G major.

The third waltz section begins with the tranquil passage "Nur keusch und rein", followed by the dramatically romantic second part ("Ja, das Alles auf Ehr") in E-flat major. A peaceful fourth waltz section in C major is next ("Doch, mehr als Gold und Geld") before the climax with cymbals in G major ("Das war' kein rechter Schiffersknecht"), which is punctuated throughout with trombones and French horns.

The coda recalls earlier material briefly before the first waltz section dances in and rushes headlong into a dazzling finish, underlined by a timpani drumroll and brass flourish.

Anton Webern created an arrangement for string quartet, harmonium, and piano for the Society for Private Musical Performances in 1921.
