= Society for Private Musical Performances =

Music organisation founded in 1918 by Arnold Schoenberg

The Society for Private Musical Performances (in German, the Verein für musikalische Privataufführungen) was an organization founded in Vienna in the autumn of 1918 by Arnold Schoenberg with the intention of making carefully rehearsed and comprehensible performances of newly composed music available to genuinely interested members of the musical public.

== History ==
In the three years between February 1919 and 5 December 1921 (when the Verein had to cease its activities due to Austrian hyperinflation), the organization gave 353 performances of 154 works in 117 concerts that involved a total of 79 individuals and pre-existing ensembles.

Circumstances permitting, concerts were given at the rate of one per week, with each programme consisting entirely of works from the period "Mahler to the present". The range of music included was very wide, the "allowable" composers not being confined to the Schoenberg circle but drawn from all those who had (as Schoenberg himself put it) "a real face or name". During the Society's first two years, in fact, Schoenberg did not allow any of his own music to be performed; instead, the programmes included works by Bartók, Berg, Busoni, Debussy, Erich Wolfgang Korngold, Mahler, Ravel, Reger, Satie, Richard Strauss, Stravinsky, Webern, and many others.

The players at these events were chosen from among the most gifted young musicians available, and each work was rehearsed intensively, either under Schoenberg himself or by a Vortragsmeister (performance director) specifically appointed by him. (The list of Vortragsmeister included Berg, Webern, Benno Sachs, Rudolf Kolisch, Erwin Stein and Eduard Steuermann). Clarity and comprehensibility of the musical presentation was the over-riding aim, with audiences sometimes being permitted to hear open rehearsals, and complex works sometimes being played more than once in the same concert (and as many as five or six times in total).

Only those who had joined the organisation were admitted to the events: the intention was to prevent casual attendance by "sensation-seeking" members of the Viennese public (who would often attend concerts with the express intention of causing disruption, whistling derisively at modern works by whistling on their house-keys) as well as exclude hostile critics who would attack such music in their newspaper columns: a sign displayed on the door – in the manner of a police notice – would state that Kritikern ist der Eintritt verboten (Critics are forbidden entry). Such was the didactic seriousness of the Society that an event's programme was not revealed in advance; nor was applause (or any demonstration of disapproval) permitted after the performance of a work.

It was in an attempt to continue the Society's activities in the face of hyperinflation that Schoenberg tried to raise money by means of an extraordinary concert during the Society's third season. On 27 May 1921, a performance took place of four waltzes by Johann Strauss II in chamber arrangements for string quartet, piano and harmonium. "Rosen aus dem Süden" and "Lagunen-Walzer" were arranged by Schoenberg; "Wein, Weib und Gesang" was arranged by Alban Berg; and the "Schatz-Walzer" (from The Gypsy Baron) was arranged by Anton von Webern. Following the performance, the autograph scores of these arrangements were auctioned. However, the Society nevertheless closed down, leaving one of its most ambitious projects - an arrangement by Hanns Eisler, Karl Rankl and Erwin Stein of Bruckner's Symphony No. 7 – unperformed.

A successor Society under the leadership of Alexander von Zemlinsky, with Schoenberg as honorary president and Heinrich Jalowetz and Viktor Ullmann among the performance directors, operated in Prague from April 1922 to May 1924. At its peak its membership was over 400, substantially larger than the Vienna Society – and, also unlike the Vienna Society, whose membership was largely made up of professional musicians, the membership of the Prague society was chiefly amateurs: a study published in 1974 mentions "civil servants, writers, doctors, lawyers, university and school teachers, businessmen, actors and painters' as well as 'students and musicians of all kinds".

The Munich ensemble Taschenphilharmonie plays in the tradition of the Society, as does the Linos Ensemble.

== See also ==
- Société musicale indépendante
