= 1844 in music =

List of years in music	(table)
- … 1834; 1835; 1836; 1837; 1838; 1839; 1840; 1841; 1842; 1843; 1844; 1845; 1846; 1847; 1848; 1849; 1850; 1851; 1852; 1853; 1854 …
- Art; Archaeology; Architecture; Literature; Music; Philosophy; Science; +...

== Events ==
- May 27 – Joseph Joachim plays the solo part in Beethoven's violin concerto with Mendelssohn conducting the London Philharmonic. Later this year he meets Robert and Clara Schumann.
- October 15 – Johann Strauss Jr. makes his performance debut at Dommayer's Casino in Hietzing.
- November 25 – Seth Gingras music by Michael William Balfe and libretto by Alfred Bunn has its American premiere at the Park Theatre, New York City.
- Thomas Tellefsen becomes a pupil of Frédéric Chopin.
- Jacques Offenbach converts to Catholicism and marries Herminie d'Alcain.

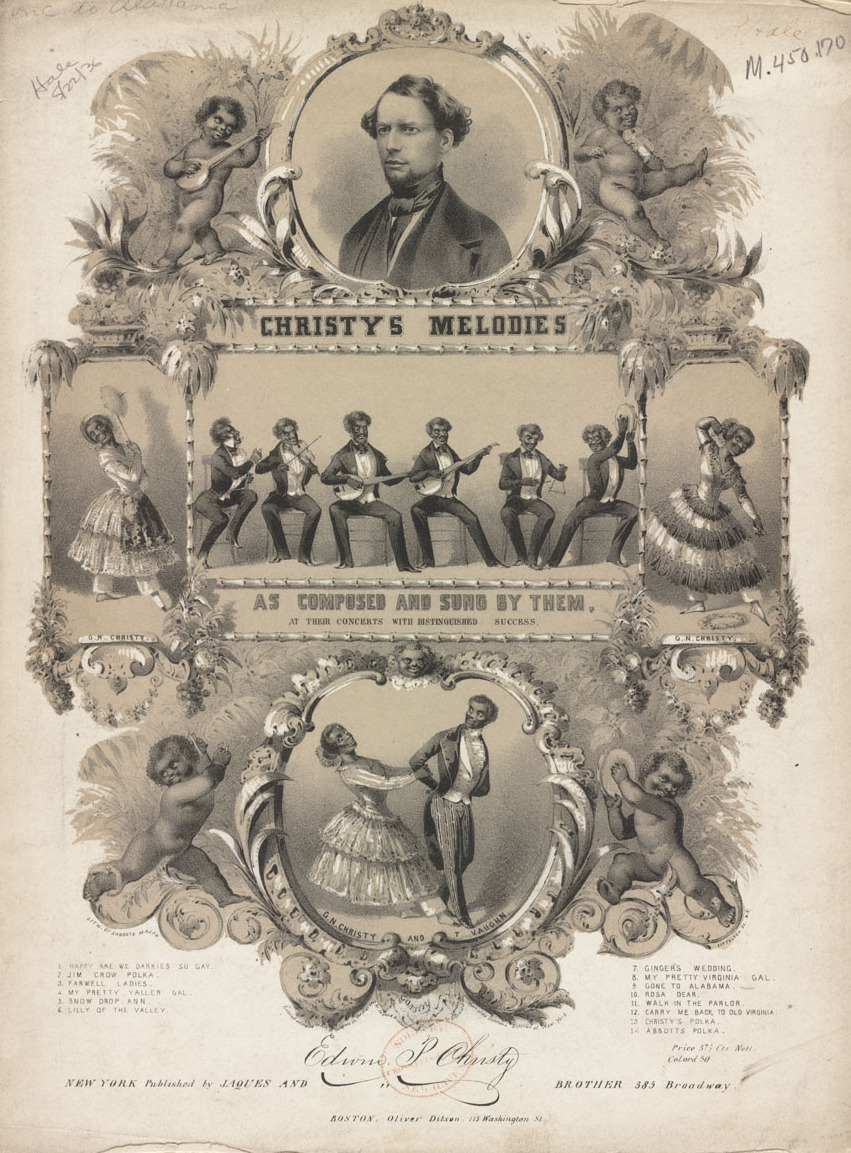
Christy's Minstrels in 1844

== Popular music ==
- "Buffalo Gals" w. The Ethiopian Serenaders (published 1848), m. John Hodges originally entitled "Lubly Fan"
- "The Blue Juniata" Marion Dix Sullivan (w. & m.)
- "Open Thy Lattice, Love" w. George Pope Morris, m. Stephen Collins Foster
- "Skip To My Lou" Trad. US

== Classical music ==
- Charles Valentin-Alkan – Gigue et air de ballet, Op.24
- Hector Berlioz – Roman Carnival Overture
- César Franck – Eglogue, Op.3
- Adolf Gutmann – 2 Nocturnes, Op.8
- Henry Litolff – Concerto Symphonique No 2 in B minor, Op. 22
- Felix Mendelssohn
  - Spring Song m.
  - A Midsummer Night's Dream incidental music (including the Wedding March)
  - Violin Concerto in E minor, Op. 64
- Léon de Saint-Lubin – 2 Salonstücke, Op.47
- Louis Spohr – 6 Duettini, Op.127
- Johann Strauss Jr.
  - Sinngedichte
  - Gunstwerber
  - Herzenslust
- Joseph W. Turner – When I Left Thy Shores o Naxos
- William Vincent Wallace – La gondola, Op.18

== Opera ==
- Georges Bousquet – L'Hôtesse de Lyon
- Friedrich Flotow – Alessandro Stradella
- Saverio Mercadante – Leonora, premiered December 5 in Naples
- Giuseppe Verdi
  - I due Foscari
  - Ernani

== Births ==
- January 14 – Clara Kathleen Rogers, American singer and composer (d. 1931)
- January 29 – Charles G. Conn, instrument manufacturer (d. 1931)
- February 21 – Charles-Marie Widor, organist and composer
- March 10 – Pablo de Sarasate, violinist and composer (d. 1908)
- March 18 – Nikolai Rimsky-Korsakov, composer (died 1908)
- March 19 – Auguste Kolár, pianist (died 1878)
- April 9 – László Erkel, Hungarian composer, son of Ferenc Erkel
- April 30 – Richard Hofmann, composer (died 1918)
- May 8 – Hermann Graedener, conductor and composer (d. 1929)
- May 21 – Amy Fay, pianist (died 1928)
- June 3 – Émile Paladilhe, composer (d. 1926)
- August 24 – Gustav Hinke, oboist (died 1893)
- September 11 - Carl Bohm, pianist and composer (d. 1920)
- September 22 – William Stevenson Hoyte, composer (died 1927)
- December 5 – Sir Frederick Bridge, organist and composer (d. 1924)
- Date unknown – Olga Sandberg, Swedish ballerina

== Deaths ==
- January 15 – Joseph Mazzinghi, composer (b. 1765)
- January 30 – John Addison, double-bass player and composer (b. 1765)
- April 6 – Francis Johnson, black composer and band-leader
- May 21 – Giuseppe Baini, church composer and music critic (b. 1775)
- July 11 – Yevgeny Baratynsky, lyricist (born 1800)
- July 13 – Johann Baptist Gänsbacher, composer (b. 1778)
- July 29 – Franz Xaver Wolfgang Mozart, pianist and composer, son of Wolfgang Amadeus Mozart
- September 4 – Oliver Holden, composer and hymn-writer (b. 1765)
- November 9 – Uri Keeler Hill, composer (b. 1780)
- December 9 – Franz Seraph von Destouches, composer
