= 1842 in music =

== Events ==
- May 31 – Frederick William IV of Prussia creates a civil class of the order Pour le Mérite for the arts and sciences. Those honoured include: Felix Mendelssohn, Franz Liszt and Gioachino Rossini.
- October 20 – Hans von Bülow attends the first performance of Wagner's Rienzi in Dresden.
- December 7 – The New York Philharmonic orchestra performs its first concert.
- Louis Gottschalk leaves the United States to obtain a classical training in Europe. Pierre Zimmerman, professor of piano at the Paris Conservatory, refuses to hear him because "America is a country of Steam Engines".
- Franz von Suppé makes his debut as a singer as Dulcamara in Donizetti's L'elisir d'amore at the Ödenburg Theatre.
- Camille Saint-Saëns begins studying piano under Camille-Marie Stamaty.

== Popular music ==
- Frederick Ellard – Sydney Corporation Quadrilles
- Antoine Gérin-Lajoie – "Un Canadien errant" ("A Wandering Canadian")

== Classical music ==
- Adolphe Adam – La jolie fille de Gand, Ballet premiered June 22 in Paris
- Jacob Arcadelt – Ave Maria
- Hector Berlioz
  - Rêverie et Caprice, H 88, premiered February 1 in Paris
  - La mort d'Ophélie, H 92, composition begun
- Franz Berwald
  - Symphony No. 1 in G minor "Sinfonie sérieuse"
  - Symphony No. 2 in D "Sinfonie capricieuse"
  - Ernste und heitere Grillen, for orchestra
  - Erinnerung an die norwegischen Alpen, for orchestra
  - Festival of the Bayadères
- Alexandre-Pierre-François Boëly – Messe du jour de Noel, Op.11
- Anton Bruckner – Windhaager Messe, WAB 25
- Frédéric Chopin
  - Mazurkas, Op.50
  - Ballade No. 4, Op.52
  - Polonaise for Piano in A-flat major, B 147/Op. 53 "Heroic"
  - Waltzes, Op.70, No. 2
- Carl Czerny – Nocturne, Op.647
- Friedrich Dotzauer – 24 Études journalières, Op.155
- Heinrich Wilhelm Ernst
  - Boléro, Op.16
  - Polonaise, Op.17
  - Feuillet d'album
- August Freyer – Concert-Fantasie, Op.1
- Niels Gade
  - 3 Nordiske Tonebilleder, Op.4
  - Violin Sonata No. 1, Op. 6
- Johann Peter Emilius Hartmann – Piano Sonata in D minor, Op.34
- Ferdinand Hiller – Die Zerstörung Jerusalems, Op.24
- Johann Wenzel Kalliwoda – Overture No.10, Op.142
- Joseph Lanner – Die Schönbrunner Waltzer
- Franz Liszt – Ave Maria I, S.20
- Felix Mendelssohn
  - Venetianisches Gondellied, MWV K 114 (Op. 57, No. 5)
  - Incidental music to A Midsummer Night's Dream (including the Wedding March)
  - Die Stille, MWV K 112 (Op. 99, No. 6)
  - Symphony No. 3 ("Scottish")
- Gioachino Rossini – Stabat Mater
- Robert Schumann
  - Three String Quartets in A minor, F and A, Op. 41
  - Piano Quintet in E-flat, Op. 44
  - Piano Quartet in E-flat, Op. 47
- Louis Spohr – Piano Sonata Op. 125
- Vaclav Veit – Concert-Ouverture, Op.17
- Henri Vieuxtemps – Le Papillon

== Opera ==
- Daniel François Esprit Auber – Le duc d'Olonne, premiered February 4 in Paris
- Gaetano Donizetti – Linda di Chamounix, May 19 at Theater am Kärntnertor, Vienna
- Mikhail Glinka – Ruslan and Lyudmila, November 27^{(Old Style)} at Bolshoi Theatre, Saint Petersburg
- Franz Paul Lachner – Catharina Cornaro, Op.71
- Albert Lortzing – Der Wildschütz, December 31 at Stadttheater, Leipzig
- Giuseppe Verdi – Nabucco, March 9 at La Scala, Milan
- Richard Wagner – Rienzi, October 20 at Hofoper, Dresden

== Musical theatre ==
- March 10 – Einen Jux will er sich machen by Johann Nestroy, with music by Adolf Müller, opens at the Theater an der Wien.

== Births ==
- February 24 – Arrigo Boito, Italian poet and composer (died 1918)
- February 25 – Karl May, lyricist (died 1912)
- March 10 – Mykola Lysenko, Ukrainian composer (died 1912)
- March 18 – Stéphane Mallarmé, lyricist (died 1898)
- March 22 – Carl Rosa, musical impresario (died 1889)
- April 14 – Sven August Körling, composer of art songs (died 1919)
- April 29 – Carl Millöcker, composer (died 1899)
- May 3 – Sophus Hagen, composer (died 1929)
- May 12 – Jules Massenet, opera composer (died 1912)
- May 13 – Arthur Sullivan, composer (died 1900)
- May 14 – Alphons Czibulka, pianist, conductor and composer (died 1894)
- May 17 – Henry Cotter Nixon, pianist (died 1907)
- May 23 – Maria Konopnicka, lyricist (died 1910)
- June 4 – Samuel Brenton Whitney, organist (died 1914)
- June 7 – Henri Gobbi, composer (died 1920)
- June 12 – Rikard Nordraak, Norwegian composer (died 1866)
- June 19 – Carl Zeller, Austrian composer (died 1898)
- June 29 – Josef Labor, composer (died 1924)
- July 4 – Gyula Erkel, Hungarian composer (died 1909), son of Ferenc Erkel
- July 16 – Eugen Maria Albrecht, composer (died 1894)
- July 29 – Charles Collette, actor and composer (died 1924)
- September 12 – Marianne Brandt, operatic contralto (died 1921)
- September 13 – Ödön Mihalovich, composer (died 1929)
- September 24 – Emma Livry, ballerina (died 1863)
- October 13 – Antonio Pasculli, oboist and composer (died 1924)
- October 26 – Hugo Alpen, composer (died 1917)
- November 8 – Eugen Gura, operatic baritone (died 1906)
- November 24
  - Peter Jerndorff, Danish opera singer and stage actor (died 1926)
  - Pavel Viskovatov, lyricist (died 1905)
- December 6 – Pavel Viskovatov, librettist (died 1905)
- date unknown – Pallavi Seshayyar, composer of Carnatic music (died 1909)

== Deaths ==
- January 7 – Joseph Czerny, composer (born 1785)
- January 9 – Alexandre Duval, librettist and actor (born 1767)
- January 19 – Heinrich Anton Hoffmann, violinist (born 1770)
- March 6 – Constanze Mozart, widow of Wolfgang Amadeus Mozart (born 1762)
- March 7 – Christian Theodor Weinlig, composer and conductor (born 1780)
- March 15 – Luigi Cherubini, composer (born 1760)
- April 6 – Johann Anton André, composer and music publisher (born 1775)
- April 14 – Jean-Nicolas Bouilly, librettist (born 1763)
- April 26 – Louis Bocquillon, composer (born 1781)
- May 5 – Jean Elleviou, operatic tenor (born 1769)
- June 4 – Georg Friedrich Treitschke, librettist (born 1776)
- June 18 – Tobias Haslinger, composer (born 1787)
- June 20 – Michael Umlauf, violinist and composer (born 1781)
- July 23 – Timothy Swan, hat-maker and composer (born 1758)
- August 21 – Johann Friedrich Leopold Duncker, lyricist (born 1768)
- August 25 – Jérôme-Joseph de Momigny, composer and music theorist (born 1762)
- September 15 – Pierre Baillot, violinist and composer (born 1771)
- October 8 – Christoph Ernst Friedrich Weyse, composer (born 1774)
- November 3 – Franz Clement, violinist, pianist, composer, conductor and friend of Beethoven (born 1780)
- November 17 – Luigi Capotorti, Italian composer (born 1767)
- December 16 – Friedrich Rochlitz, musicologist (born 1769)
- December 18 – Giuseppe Nicolini, composer (born 1762)
- December 25 – Bedřich Diviš Weber, composer and founding principal of the Prague Conservatory (born 1766)
