= Heart's Content =

Heart's Content may refer to:

- Heart's Content, Newfoundland and Labrador
- Hearts Content National Scenic Area, an old growth forest in Warren County, Pennsylvania
- Gunstwerber, a waltz composed by Johann Strauss II
- Heart's Content (album)
