= The Blue Juniata =

1844 song by Marion Dix Sullivan

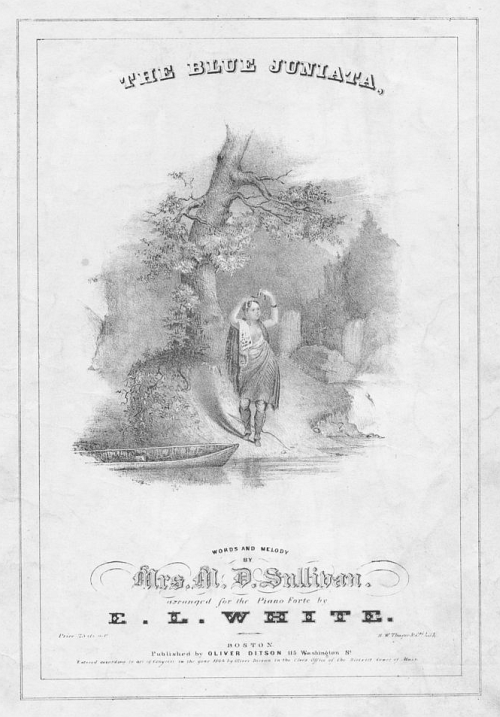
- Cover of sheet music, 1844.

Song
- Language: English
- Written: 1844
- Songwriter: Marion Dix Sullivan

"The Blue Juniata" is a popular song written by Marion Dix Sullivan in 1844. It was one of the most popular parlor songs of the nineteenth century, and the first commercially successful song written by an American woman. The song was referenced by Mark Twain in his autobiography and recorded in 1937 by Roy Rogers and the early Sons of the Pioneers.

In "The Blue Juniata", bright Alfarata, the Indian girl, sings the praises of her warrior while she travels along the Juniata River. This character is the namesake of the city of Alpharetta, Georgia.

== Lyrics ==
"The Blue Juniata" as first published:

Wild roved an Indian girl,
Bright Alfarata,
Where sweep the waters
Of the blue Juniata!
Swift as an antelope
Through the forest going,
Loose were her jetty locks,
In many tresses flowing.

Gay was the mountain song
Of bright Alfarata,
Where sweep the waters
Of the blue Juniata.
"Strong and true my arrows are,
In my painted quiver,
Swift goes my light canoe
Adown the rapid river.

"Bold is my warrior good,
The love of Alfarata,
Proud waves his snowy plume
Along the Juniata.
Soft and low he speaks to me,
And then, his war-cry sounding,
Rings his voice in thunder loud,
From height to height resounding."

So sang the Indian girl,
Bright Alfarata,
Where sweep the waters
Of the blue Juniata.
Fleeting years have borne away
The voice of Alfarata;
Still sweeps the river on—
Blue Juniata!

== Bibliography ==
- Pendle, Karin. Women & Music: A History. Bloomington, Indiana: Indiana University Press (2001).
- Sullivan, Marion Dix. "The Blue Juniata" (Sheet music). Boston: Oliver Ditson (1844). Two versions of this work may be found digitally scanned at The Library of Congress.
