= Herzenslust =

Polka composed by Johann Strauss II

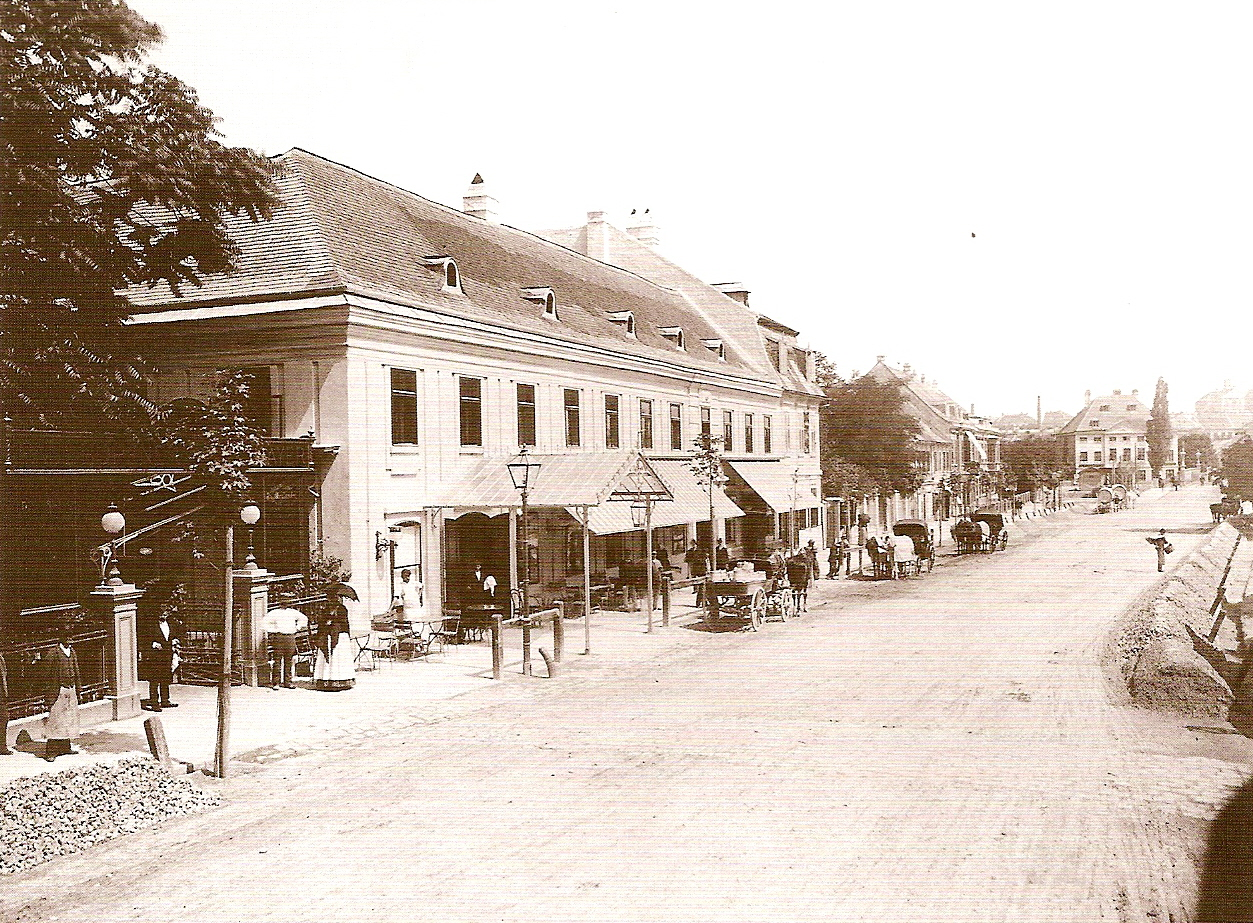
Dommayer's Casino, where Johann Strauss II made his debut

Herzenslust (Heart's Content), Op. 3, is a polka composed by Johann Strauss II in the fall of 1844 for his debut as a composer at the Dommayer's Casino establishment in Vienna. It was performed along with several of Strauss' other early compositions, such as the waltzes Sinngedichte and Gunstwerber, and the Debut-Quadrille. Reviewing Strauss' debut, the journal Der Wanderer noted that both the Debut-Quadrille and the Herzenslust Polka "are so piquant in their inspiration, and handled with such glittering effect in the instrumentation that we […] have to recognise and commend the bold and exuberant talent of Strauss Son."
