= Libochovany =

- Municipality
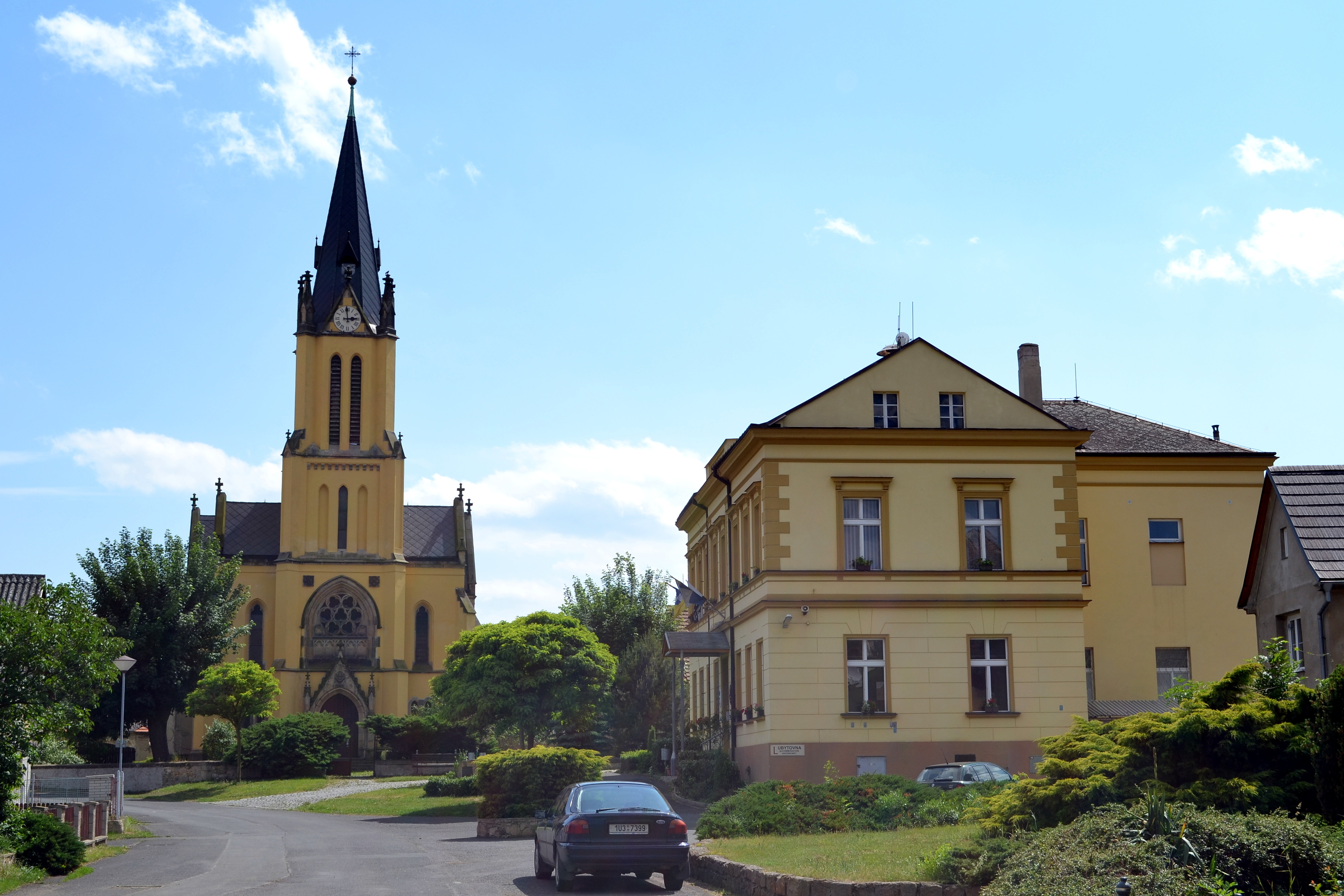
- Church of the Nativity of the Virgin Mary and the municipal office

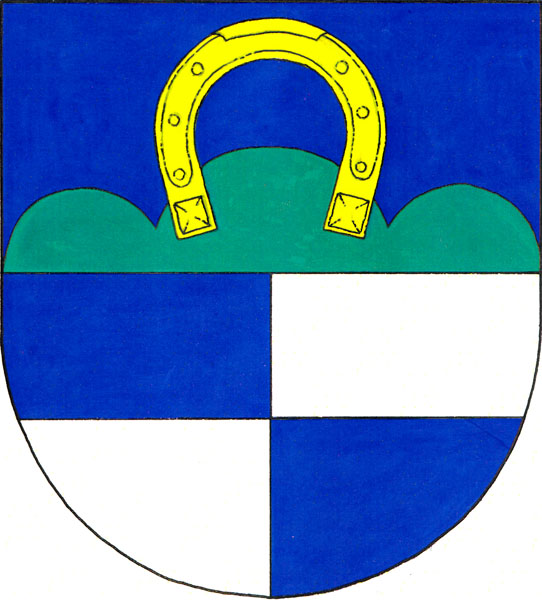
- Flag Coat of arms

- Location in the Czech Republic
- Coordinates: 50°33′19″N 14°9′24″E
- Country: Czech Republic
- Region: Ústí nad Labem
- District: Litoměřice
- First mentioned: 1057

Area
  - Total: 8.30 km^{2} (3.20 sq mi)
- Elevation: 143 m (469 ft)

Population (2026-01-01)
  - Total: 588
  - Density: 70.8/km^{2} (183/sq mi)
- Time zone: UTC+1 (CET)
  - Summer (DST): UTC+2 (CEST)
- Postal codes: 411 03, 412 01
- Website: www.libochovany.cz

Libochovany is a municipality and village in Litoměřice District in the Ústí nad Labem Region of the Czech Republic. It has about 600 inhabitants.

Libochovany lies approximately 7 kilometres (4 mi) north-west of Litoměřice, 11 km (7 mi) south of Ústí nad Labem, and 60 km (37 mi) north-west of Prague.

== Administrative division ==
Libochovany consists of two municipal parts (in brackets population according to the 2021 census):

- Libochovany (484)
- Řepnice (73)

== Demographics ==
Historical population
Year	Pop.	±%
1869	613	—
1880	645	+5.2%
1890	647	+0.3%
1900	660	+2.0%
1910	777	+17.7%
1921	733	−5.7%
1930	931	+27.0%
1950	714	−23.3%
1961	760	+6.4%
1970	676	−11.1%
1980	630	−6.8%
1991	521	−17.3%
2001	551	+5.8%
2011	583	+5.8%
2021	557	−4.5%
Source: Censuses

== Notable people ==
- Václav Jindřich Veit (1806–1864), Czech-Austrian composer
