= Debut-Quadrille =

1844 musical composition by Johann Strauss II

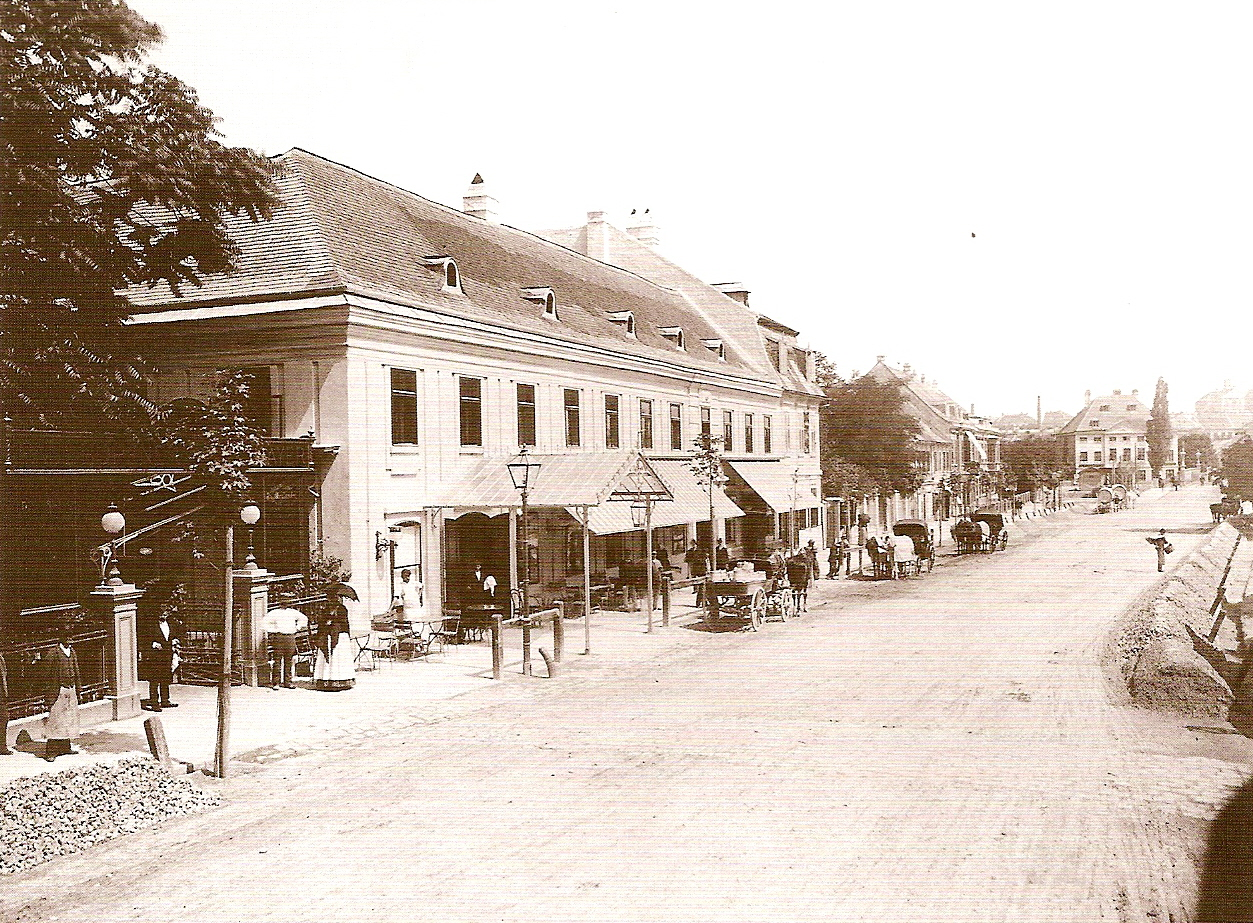
Dommayer's Casino, where Johann Strauss II made his début

Debut-Quadrille, Op. 2, is a quadrille composed by Johann Strauss II. It was one of four compositions that Strauss had written for his début as a composer at the Dommayer's Casino in Hietzing, Vienna in the fall of 1844. The composition is in standard Viennese quadrille form, with six sections, named: No. 1 Pantalon; No. 2 Été; No. 3 Poule; No. 4 Trénis; No. 5 Pastourelle; No. 6 Finale.
