= Ureli Corelli Hill =

American conductor (1802–1875)

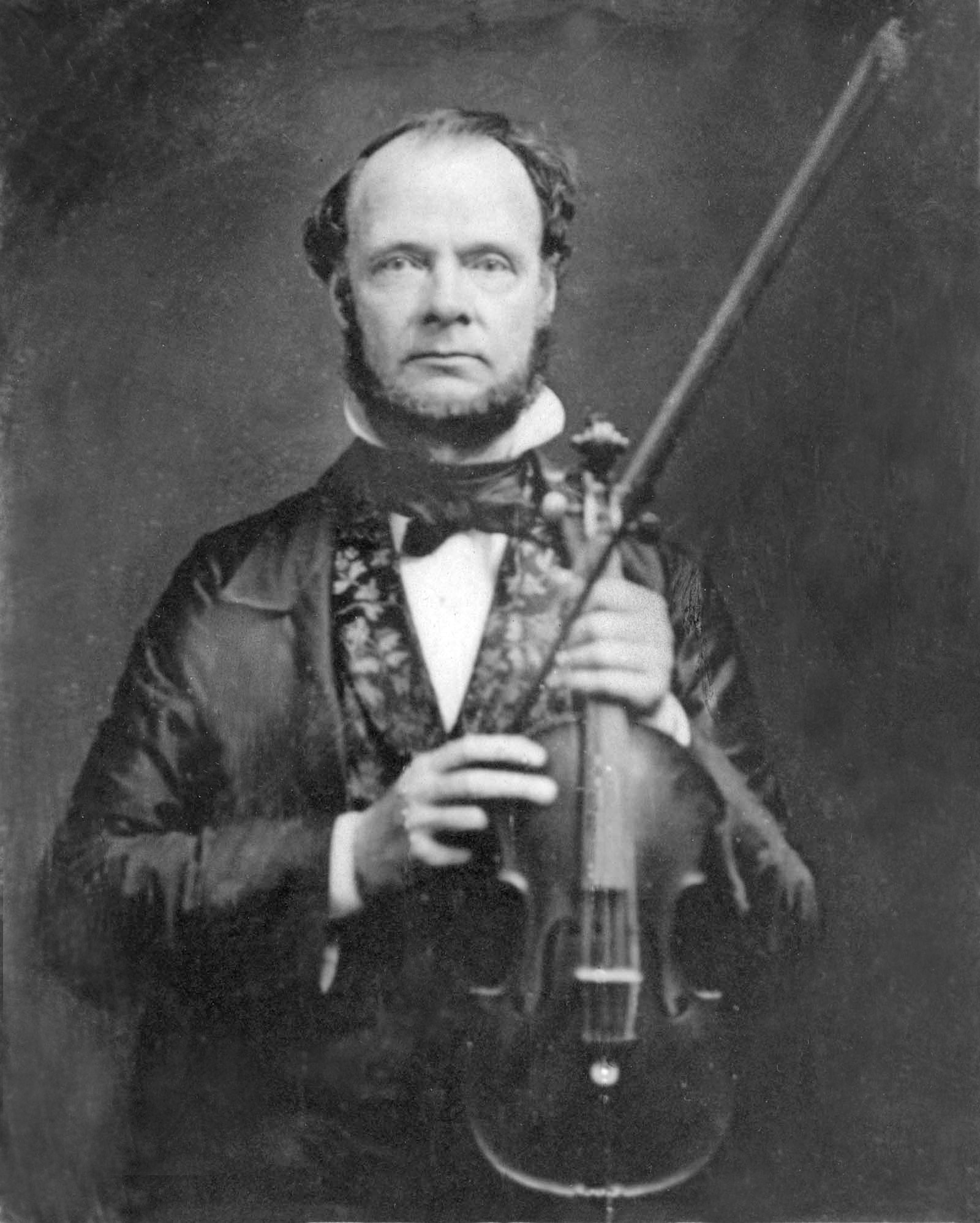
Ureli Corelli Hill

Ureli Corelli Hill (1802 – September 2, 1875) was an American conductor, and the first president and conductor of the New York Philharmonic Society.

== Biography ==
Hill was born in 1802 in Hartford, Connecticut.

His grandfather, Frederick Hill, was a fifer in the Revolutionary army. His father, Uri Keeler Hill, was a music teacher and composer. Ureli's only sibling, George Handel "Yankee" Hill, was a writer and actor noted for his depiction of Yankee characters.

Hill served alternately as conductor and violinist with the New York Sacred Music Society between 1828 and 1835. In 1838 he directed the first American performance of Mendelssohn's cantata St. Paul. He studied in Germany for two years with the composer, conductor, and violinist Louis Spohr. After returning to New York, Hill organized the meeting on April 2, 1842, at which the New York Philharmonic Society was founded. At the meeting, Hill was named the first president of the society.

Hill opened the society's inaugural concert on December 7, 1842, by conducting Beethoven's Fifth Symphony. As was typical of this era, the concert featured several different conductors and a mixture of opera excerpts, full orchestral works, and chamber music. Later during the same concert, Hill played violin in a performance of a Hummel Piano Quintet. For the orchestra's third season, Hill invited both Spohr and Felix Mendelssohn to conduct, however neither could accept, sending letters of acknowledgement instead. Both were later made honorary members of the philharmonic. Hill continued to conduct the society, in alternation with six others, until 1849.

Hill was in Ohio from 1847 to 1850, but returned to New York, and signed on as violinist, and board member of the orchestra. In his capacity as board member, he became embroiled in the controversy over the nature of American music and the role the orchestra should take to foster and promote American composers such as George Bristow and William Henry Fry.

Hill had a series of failed artistic and business ventures. He invented a piano that would never go out of tune, as it used small bells instead of wire strings. He traveled as far as London in an effort to commercialize the instrument, but it did not succeed. He also made bad investments in real estate in New Jersey. These difficulties, combined with his forced retirement from the violins of the philharmonic on account of his old age, are thought to have contributed to his taking his own life on September 2, 1875, at his home in Paterson, New Jersey. His farewell note, written before swallowing an overdose of morphine, stated "Why should or how can a man exist and be powerless to earn means for his family?"

== Bibliography ==
- Grove, George (1908). J A Fuller-Maitland (ed.). Grove's Dictionary of Music and Musicians. Vol. iv (2nd ed.). London: Macmillan. OCLC 17517502.
- Ritter, Frédéric Louis (1883). Music in America. New York: Charles Scribner's Sons. OCLC 23862794.
- Stevenson, Robert. 2001. "Hill, Ureli Corelli". The New Grove Dictionary of Music and Musicians, second edition, edited by Stanley Sadie and John Tyrrell. London: Macmillan Publishers.
