= Charles Wels =

American composer

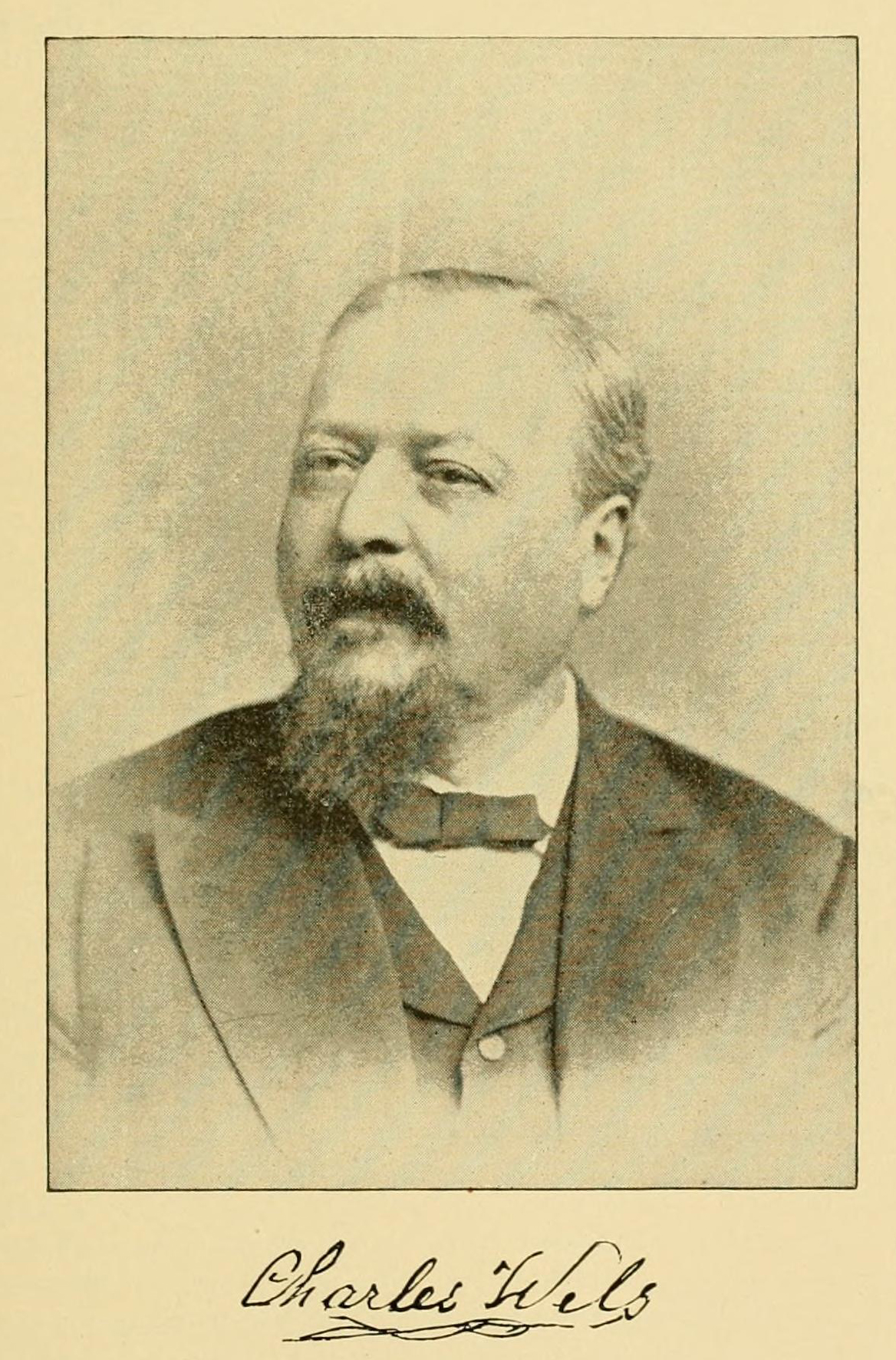
Charles Wels, before 1889

Charles Wels (August 24, 1825 in Prague – May 12, 1906 in New York City) was an American pianist, organist, composer, and music teacher. He studied under Václav Tomášek before relocating to the US. In the US he produced piano compositions and a funeral march for Abraham Lincoln. (The Library of Congress has scanned in 60 compositions by Wels into its American Memory collection.)

He was briefly a Polish court-musician from 1847 to 1849. In the 1860s he was organist at Christ Church of New York.

His pupils included Samuel Brenton Whitney.
