= Henry Cotter Nixon =

British composer (1842–1907)

Henry Cotter Nixon FRCO
- Born: May 17, 1842; London
- Died: 25 December 1907 (aged 65); Bromley
- Education: University of Cambridge (BMus)
- Occupation: Composer

Henry Cotter Nixon (17 May 1842 – 25 December 1907) was a British musician and composer. He is credited as possibly being the author of the first British symphonic poem.

== Early life and education ==
Nixon was born on 17 May 1842 in Kennington, South London, the fourth son of Henry George Nixon (1796– 1849), an organist and composer, and Caroline Melissa Danby. Caroline was the daughter of Sarah Danby, mistress to J. M. W. Turner. Henry George Nixon died of cholera when Nixon was seven, leaving the family in perilous finances.

As a teenager, he studied under a family friend, Harry Deval. He also continued studying privately with Henry Smart, Charles Steggall, and George Alexeander Macfarren. In 1876, he received a Bachelor of Music from the University of Cambridge.

== Career ==
In 1859, he became the organist at St Mary’s Roman Catholic Church in Hull. Around 1860, he returned to London and wrote his earliest surviving work, Nightingale Quadrilles. During the 1860s, he was an active musician, becoming second violinist in the Sacred Harmonic Society Orchestra in 1862. He made his debut as a pianist in 1864. He was a Fellow and Council Member of the Royal College of Organists in 1867 and 1868 respectively.

In 1872, he moved to Sussex due to ill health, where he became organist at St Mary Magdalen Church, St Leonards-on Sea. In 1876, he was appointed conductor of the Hastings and St Leonards Orchestra. His Piano Trio No. 1 in C won the gold medal at the Chamber Music Competition organised by Trinity College, Cambridge. In 1882, he wrote Palamon and Arcite, potentially the first British symphonic poem.

In 1888, he established the Hastings and St Leonards College of Music with Val Marriott and Herbert Dorman. Around this time, he returned to London, where his career largely faded. None of his orchestral works are known to have been performed after this point.

== Personal life ==
In November 1873, he married his student Alice Mary Woodward who died of breast cancer in September 1895. They had three children. His son Henry died of diphtheria in 1892 at the age of thirteen.

Nixon died of prostate cancer in 1907. He was survived by his son Conrad Nixon. His and his father's papers are held by the Royal College of Music.

== Bibliography ==
- The Tonic Sol-Fa System : What Is It? (1898)

== Compositions (selective list) ==
=== Orchestral ===
- 1879 – Piano Trio No. 1 in C:Sub Judice
- 1880 – Concert Overture No. 1:Titania
- 1880s – Concert Overture No. 2:Anima et Fide
- 1880s –Concert Overture No. 3:|Jacta est alea
- 1882 – Palamon and Arcite
- 1883 – Concert-Stück, Op. 14
- 1884 – May Day, Op.16
- 1889 – Dance of the Sea Nymphs
- 1902 – Coronation March (unfinished)

=== Choral and Vocal ===
- 1890 – Aslauga:Overture
- c.1895 – Apollo (unfinished)

=== Operatic and stage ===
- 1895 – The Witch of Esgair
- 1895 – The Gay Typewriters

=== Chamber Music ===
- 1881 – Uno Amino
- 1884 – String Quartet, Op.15
