= Marion Dix Sullivan =

American classical composer

Marion Dix Sullivan (1802–1860) (fl. 1840–50) was an American songwriter and composer. She was born in Boscawen, New Hampshire, the daughter of Timothy Dix and Abigail Wilkins and the sister of General John Adams Dix of New York. She married John Whiting Sullivan in 1825 and had one son, John Henry, who died of drowning in 1858.

Little is known about her background, but she was considered the first American woman to write a "hit" song, "The Blue Juniata," which was referenced by Mark Twain in his autobiography. The Blue Juniata was the basis for variation sets by other well-known 19th century American composers, such as Charles Grobe and J. Edgar Gould. The song was recorded in 1937 by Roy Rogers and the early Sons of the Pioneers. The song was also referenced with the full lyrics by Laura Ingalls Wilder in her book Little House on the Prairie. It was recorded again by soprano Mara Sindoni as part of her project, Parlor, Music Hall, And Church: A Quilt of Songs By American Women Composers (1790 – 1890) From the American Antiquarian Society's Collections.

Thanks to the research of Pennsylvania musician, Zachariah King, Marion's gravesite and headstone has been located and is currently in the process of being restored and reset. She is interred in Brookline Massachusetts at the Walnut Street Cemetery on Walnut Street, Plot B, next to her two daughters and son.

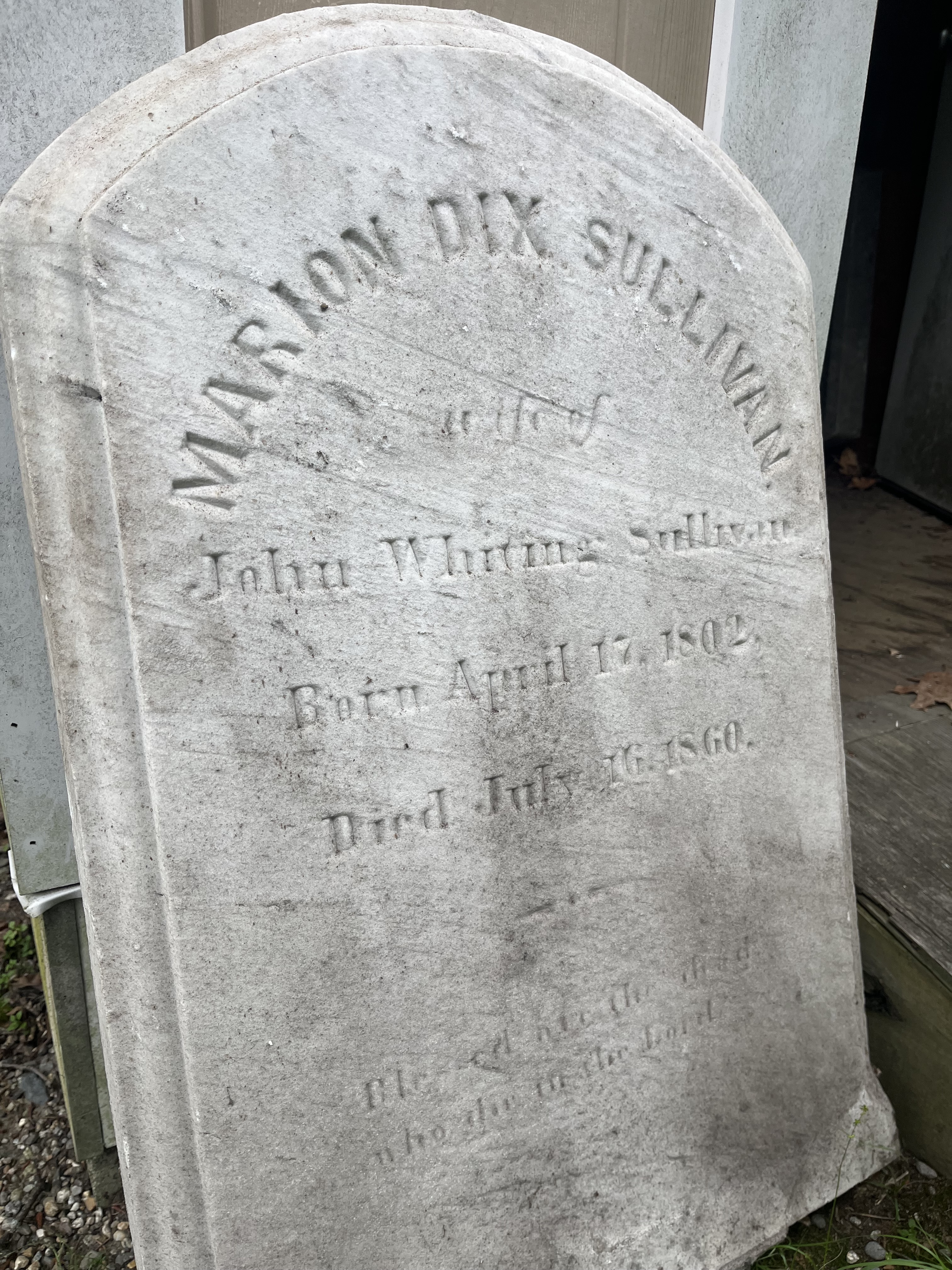
Marion Dix Sullivan headstone after being recovered from a shed on the Old Burial Ground, likely in storage for 15 years.

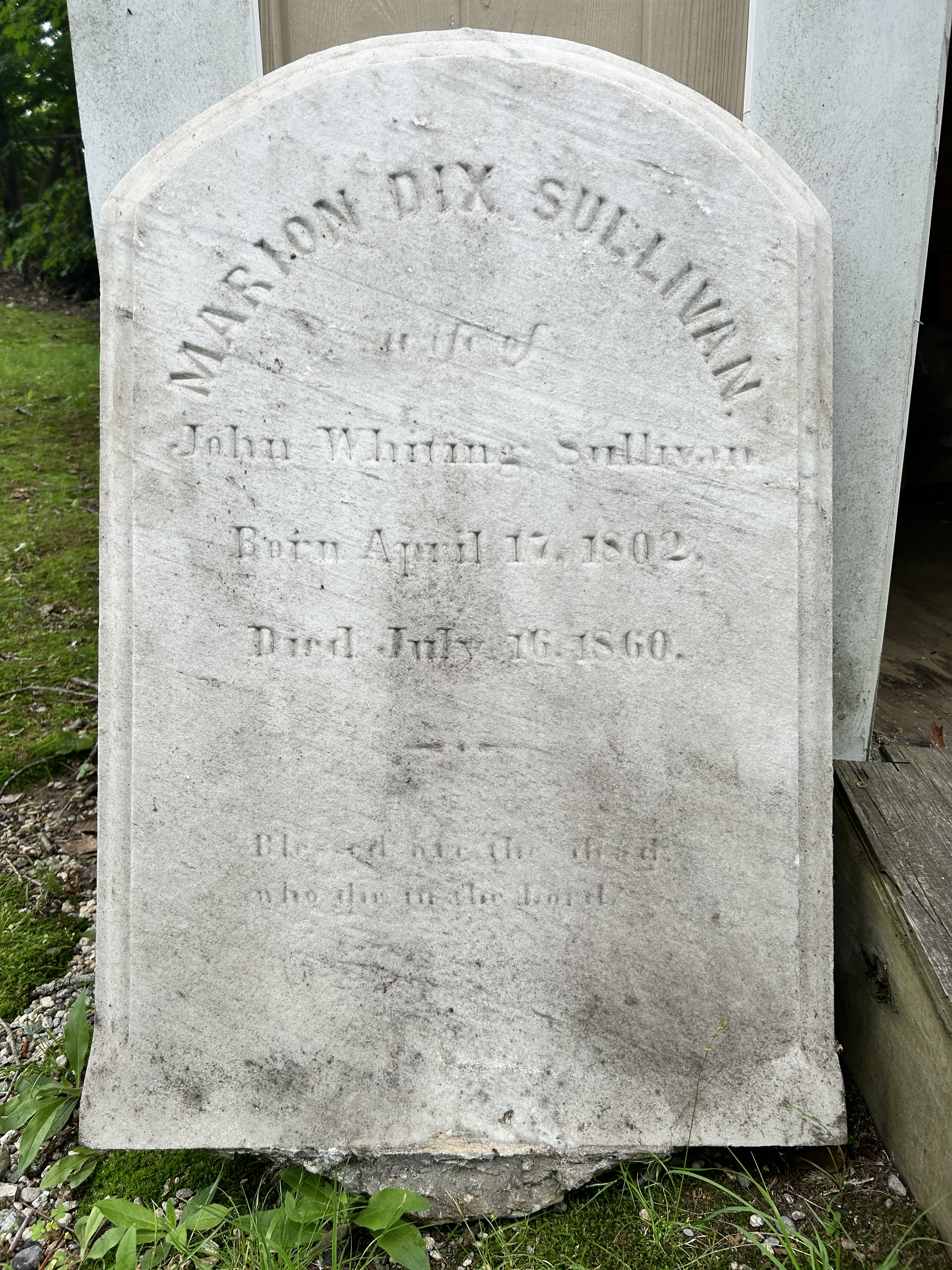
Marion Dix Sullivan headstone after being recovered from a shed on the Old Burial Ground, likely in storage for 15 years.

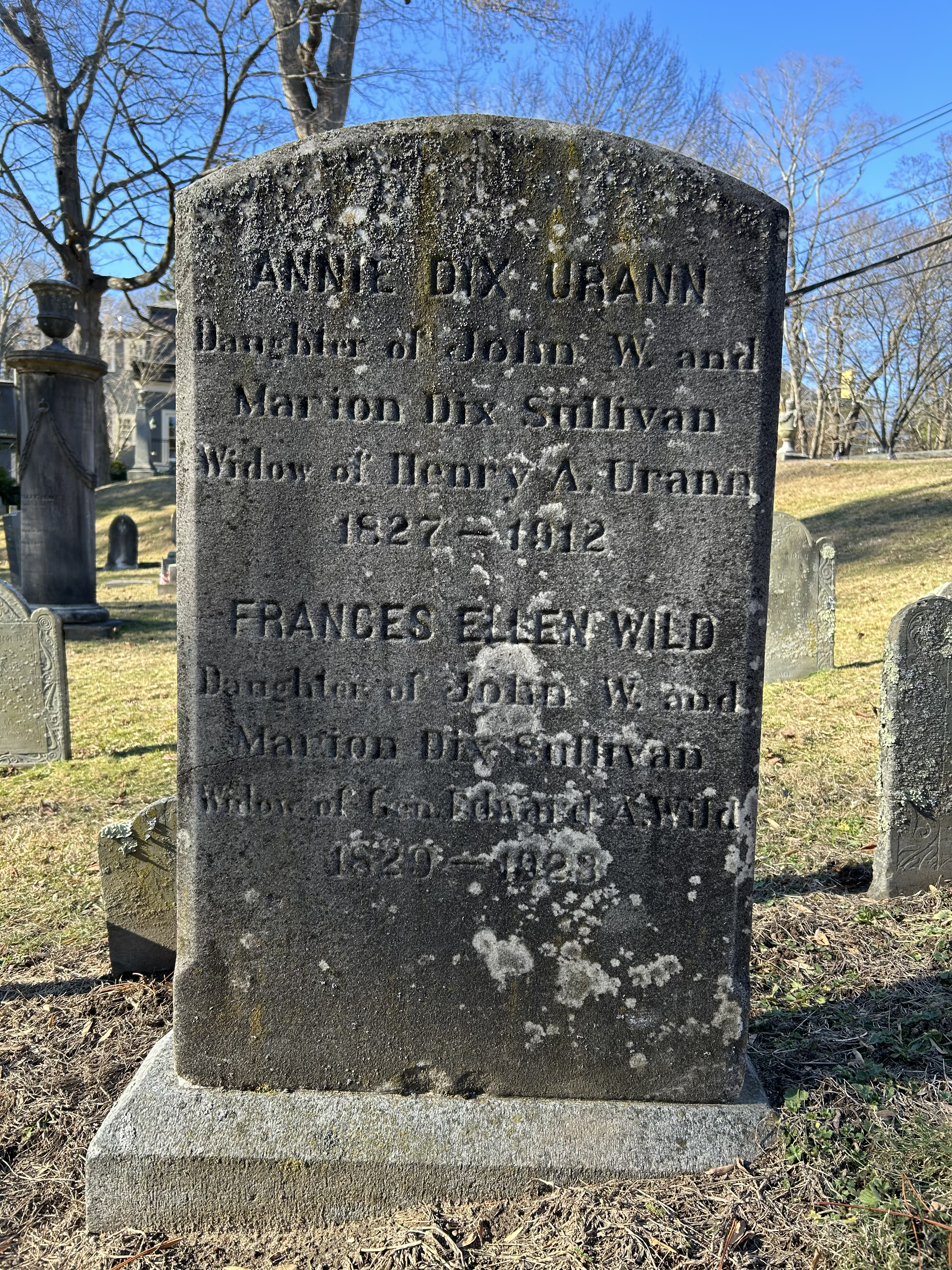
Marion's Daughters interred in the family plot next to their mother; Annie Dix Urann and Frances Ellen Wild

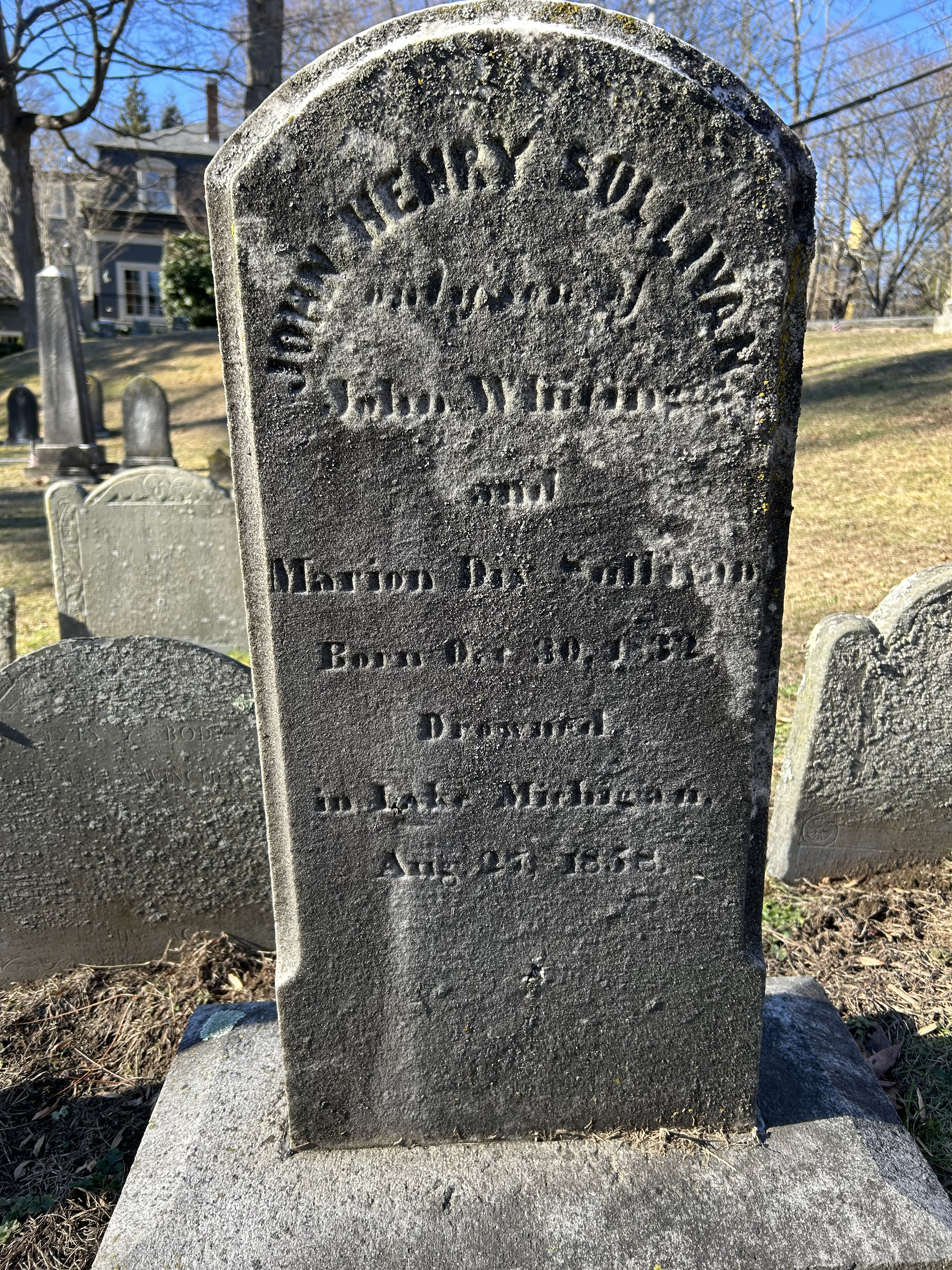
Marion's Son; John Henry Sullivan interred in the family plot.

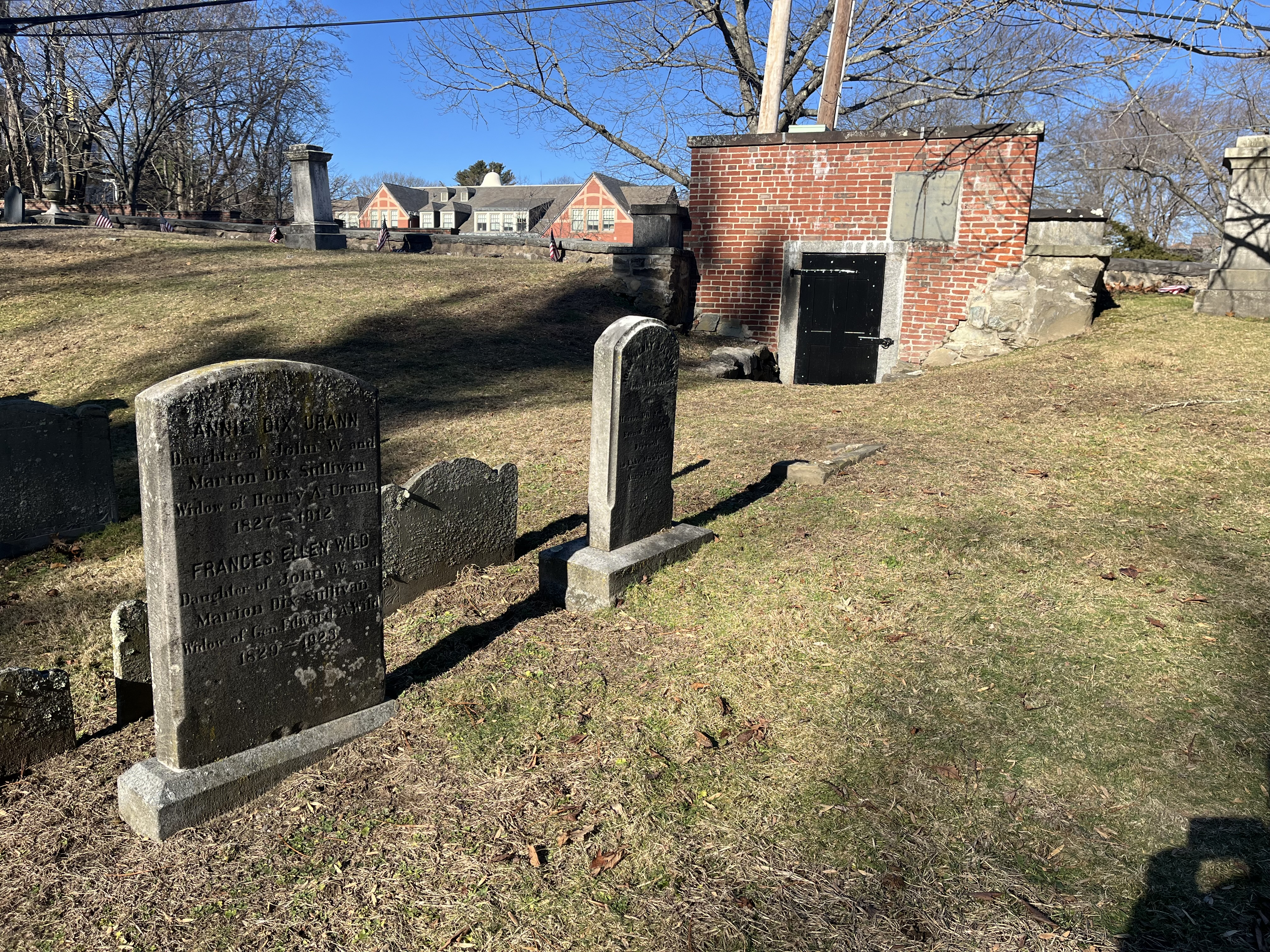
The location of the 3 Sullivan graves, The Duaghters, John Henry and Marion
(broken base stone)

== Works ==
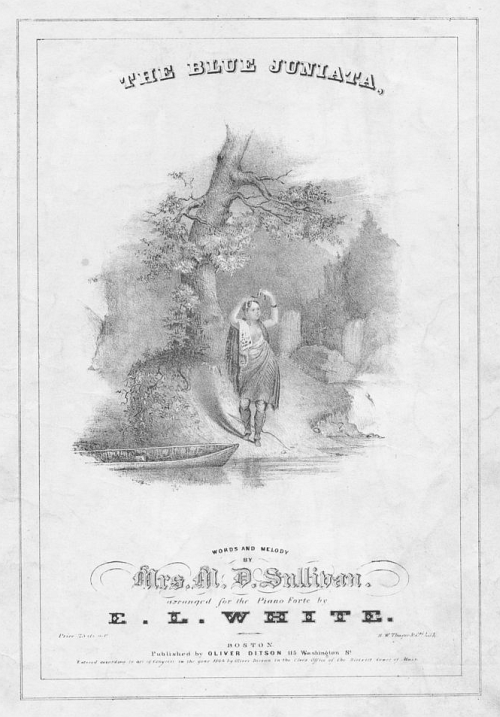
Cover of "The Blue Juniata" (1844)

Marion Dix wrote ballads and sacred songs. Selected works include:

- The Blue Juniata (1844)
- Marion Day (1844)
- Jessee Cook, the Lily of the Wood (1844)
- Oh! Boatman, Row Me O'er the Stream (1846)
- Cold Blew the Night Wing : The Wanderer (1846)
- The Cold Has Bound the Joyous Stream (1846)
- The Evening Bugle (1847)
- The Field of Monterey (1846)
- Mary Lindsey (1848)
- The Strawberry Girl (1850)
- We Cross the Prairies of Old (1854)
- The Kansas Home (1854)
- Juniata Ballads, compilation (1855)
- Bible Songs, compilation (1856)
- Bright Alfarata (1871?)
- Lightly On
- Evening Hymn to the Savior
- O'er our way when we first parted
