= Uri Keeler Hill =

American classical composer (1780–1844)

Uri Keeler Hill (10 December 1780 – 9 November 1844) was a Vermont composer. In 1805, Uri Hill became the organist for the Brattle Street Church in Boston. He moved to New York to continue his music career in 1810 and premiered an "Ode" in 1814. In 1836, Uri Keller traveled to Europe to study with Ludwig Spohr.

Hill's son, Ureli Corelli Hill, was the founding director of the New York Philharmonic.

== Publications ==
- The Vermont Harmony (1801)
- A Number of Original Airs, Duetto’s and Trio’s (1803)
- The Sacred Minstrel (1806)
- The Handelian Repository (1814)
- Solfegio Americano (1820)
