= Václav Jindřich Veit =

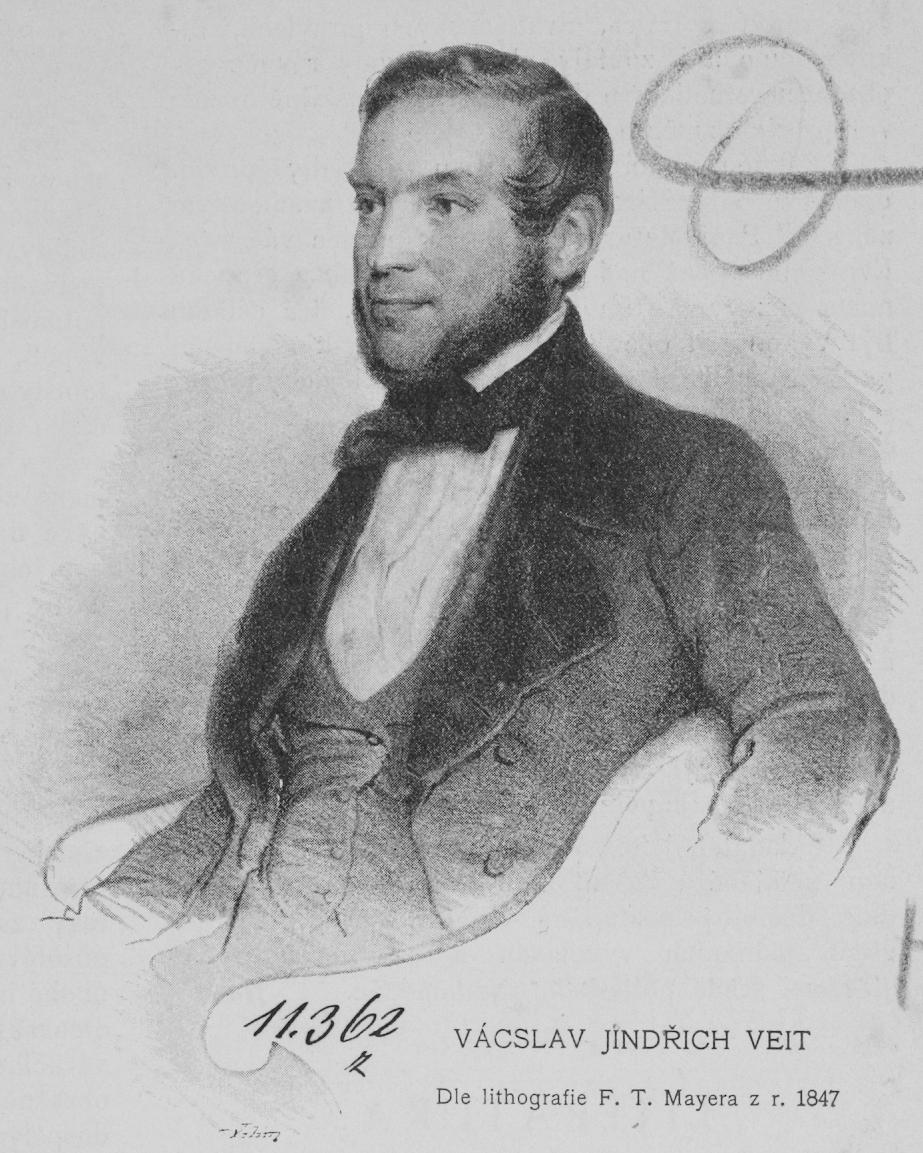
Václav Jindřich Veit in 1847

Václav Jindřich Veit (German: Wenzel Heinrich Veit; 19 January 1806 – 16 February 1864) was a Czech-Austrian composer, pianist and lawyer.

== Life ==
Veit was born on 19 January 1806 in Řepnice, Bohemia (now part of Libochovany, Czech Republic). To pay tuition at a law school in Prague, Veit gave music lessons. After earning his law degree and getting a position as a legal clerk, Veit continued to teach music and even started writing music. He wrote mostly chamber music, and later on in his life wrote more and more songs with texts in Czech, such as "Pozdravení pěvcovo". He also wrote some church music, including a setting of the Te Deum and a couple of masses. Although he wrote some orchestral music, such as a violin concertino and a parody of Berlioz's Symphonie fantastique, Veit only wrote one symphony, in E minor, which is however considered "a notable milestone in the development of the Czech symphonic style."

Veit died on 16 February 1864 in Litoměřice.
