= Samuel Brenton Whitney =

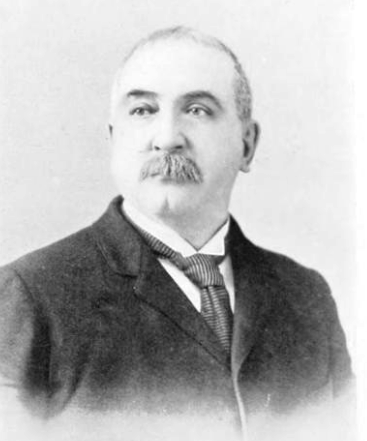
- Born: June 4, 1842; Woodstock, Vermont
- Died: August 3, 1914 (aged 72); Woodstock, Vermont
- Occupations: Composer, conductor, organist

Samuel Brenton Whitney (June 4, 1842 – August 3, 1914) was a United States organist, conductor and composer. His compositions were primarily church music and chamber works.

== Biography ==
Samuel Brenton Whitney was born in Woodstock, Vermont on June 4, 1842. He was a pupil of Charles Wels of New York City and then John Knowles Paine of Cambridge, Massachusetts. He secured his first organ appointment in Cambridge. He came to be regarded as the greatest interpreter of Johann Sebastian Bach in the United States, and was appointed professor of organ playing and lecturer in music at the Boston University and the New England Conservatory. In 1871 he was appointed organist and choir director of the Church of the Advent, Boston. His compositions included many anthems and other church pieces, songs, pianoforte music, sonatas, transcriptions, and arrangements for the organ. The Arthur P. Schmidt company's first publication was the Whitney anthem Deus misereatur (God Be Merciful Unto Us).

He died at his sister's home in Woodstock on August 3, 1914.
