= Sinngedichte =

1844 waltz composed by Johann Strauss II

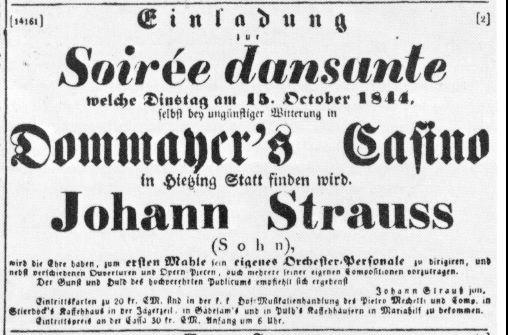

Sinngedichte (Poems of the Senses or Epigrams), Op. 1, is a waltz composed by Johann Strauss II in 1844 for his debut as a composer at Dommayer's Casino in Vienna. The waltz was played along with several other compositions that Strauss had written for the occasion, such as the waltz Gunstwerber and the polka Herzenslust. The waltz was an unprecedented success when first performed, and had to be repeated a record nineteen times.

Waltz 1
