= Sven August Körling =

Swedish composer (1842–1919)

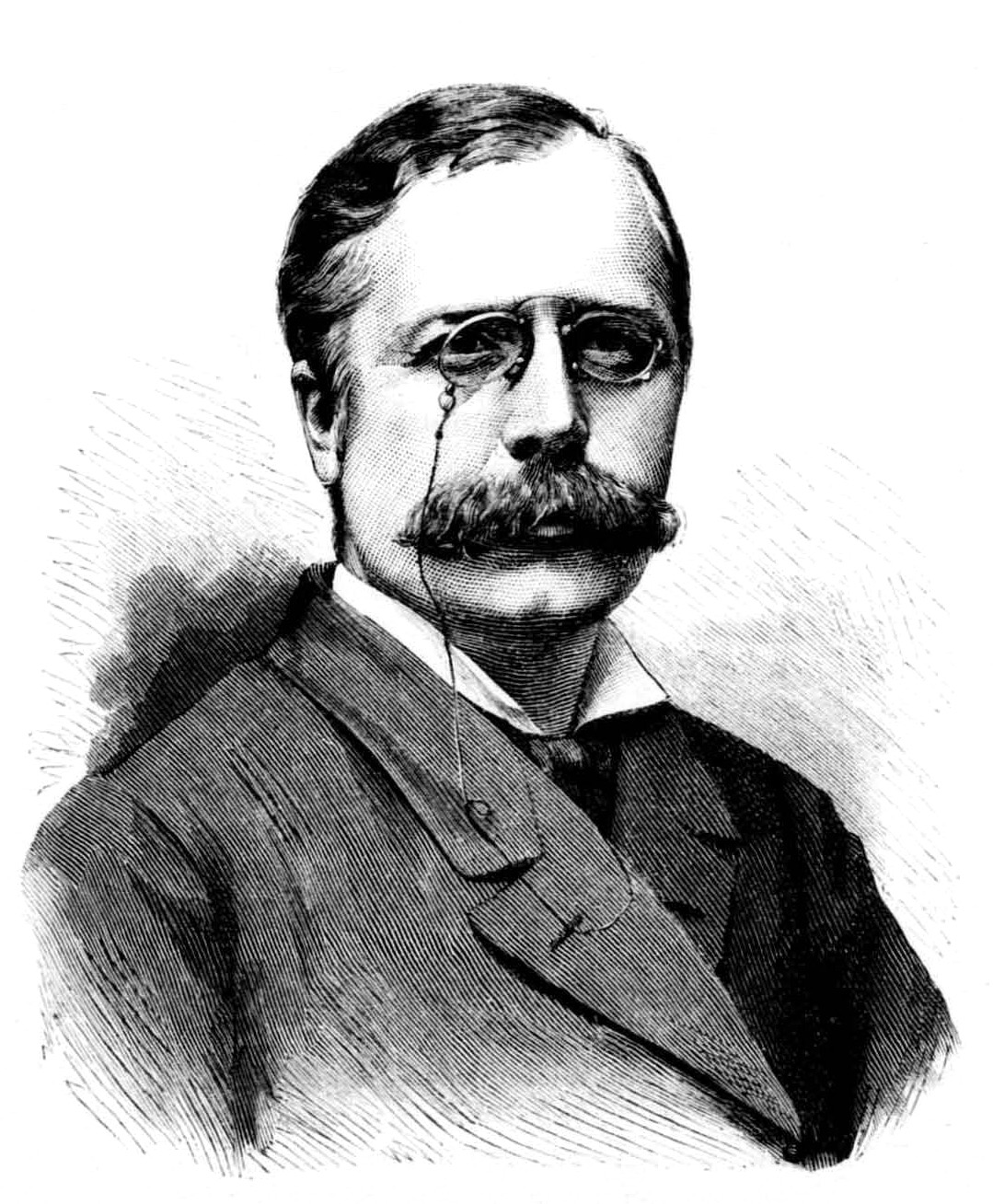
August Körling. Xylography 1890.

Sven August Körling (14 April 1842 – 17 October 1919) was a Swedish composer, remembered for his art songs. Early in his career Jussi Björling recorded Körling's song "Evening mood". Körling's "Pastorale" for horn and organ dates from 1898 to 1899.

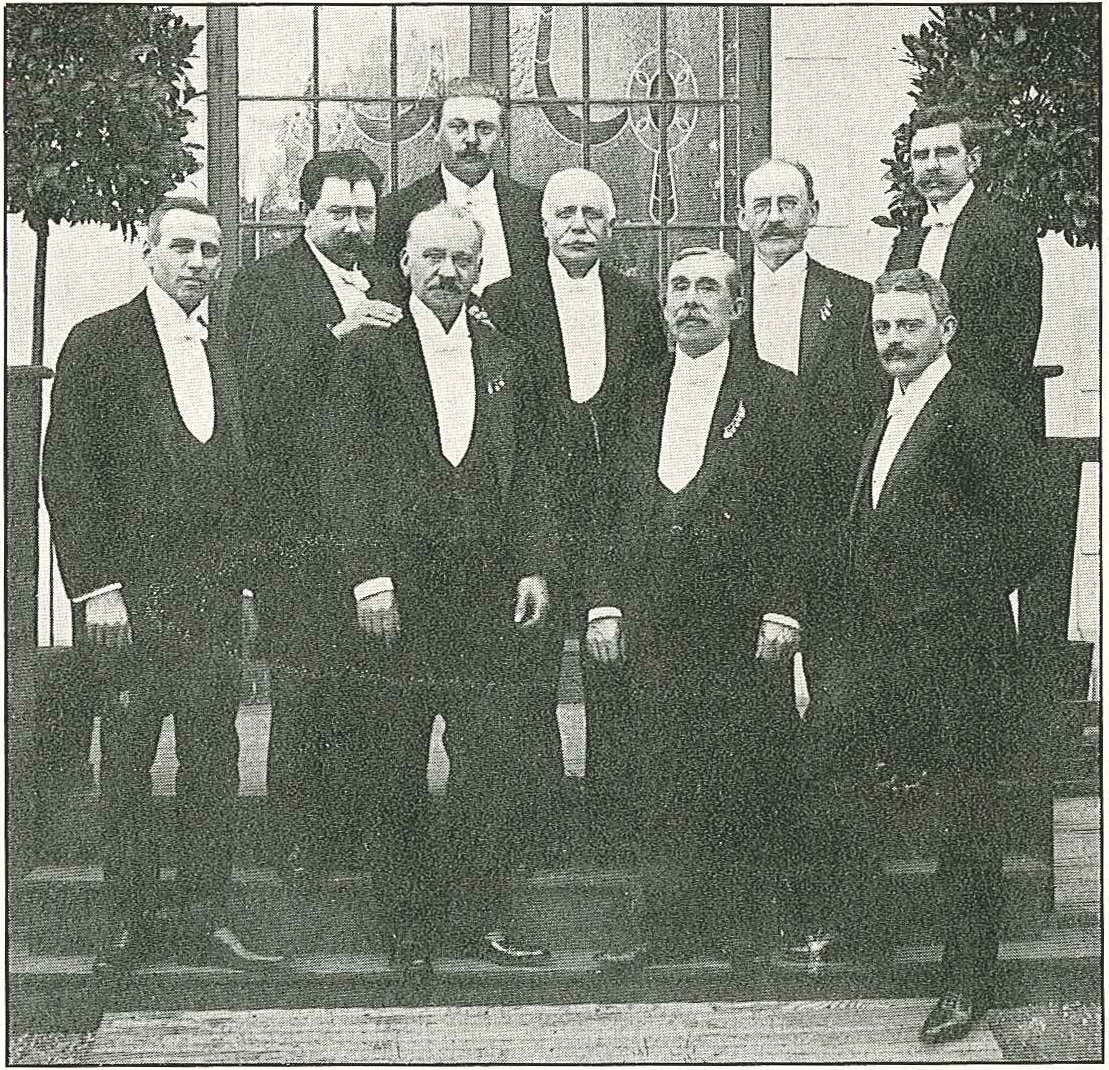
Group photo from the chamber music festival in Ystad 1910. The white-haired Körling is seen in the middle of the back row.
