= August Freyer =

German organist and composer

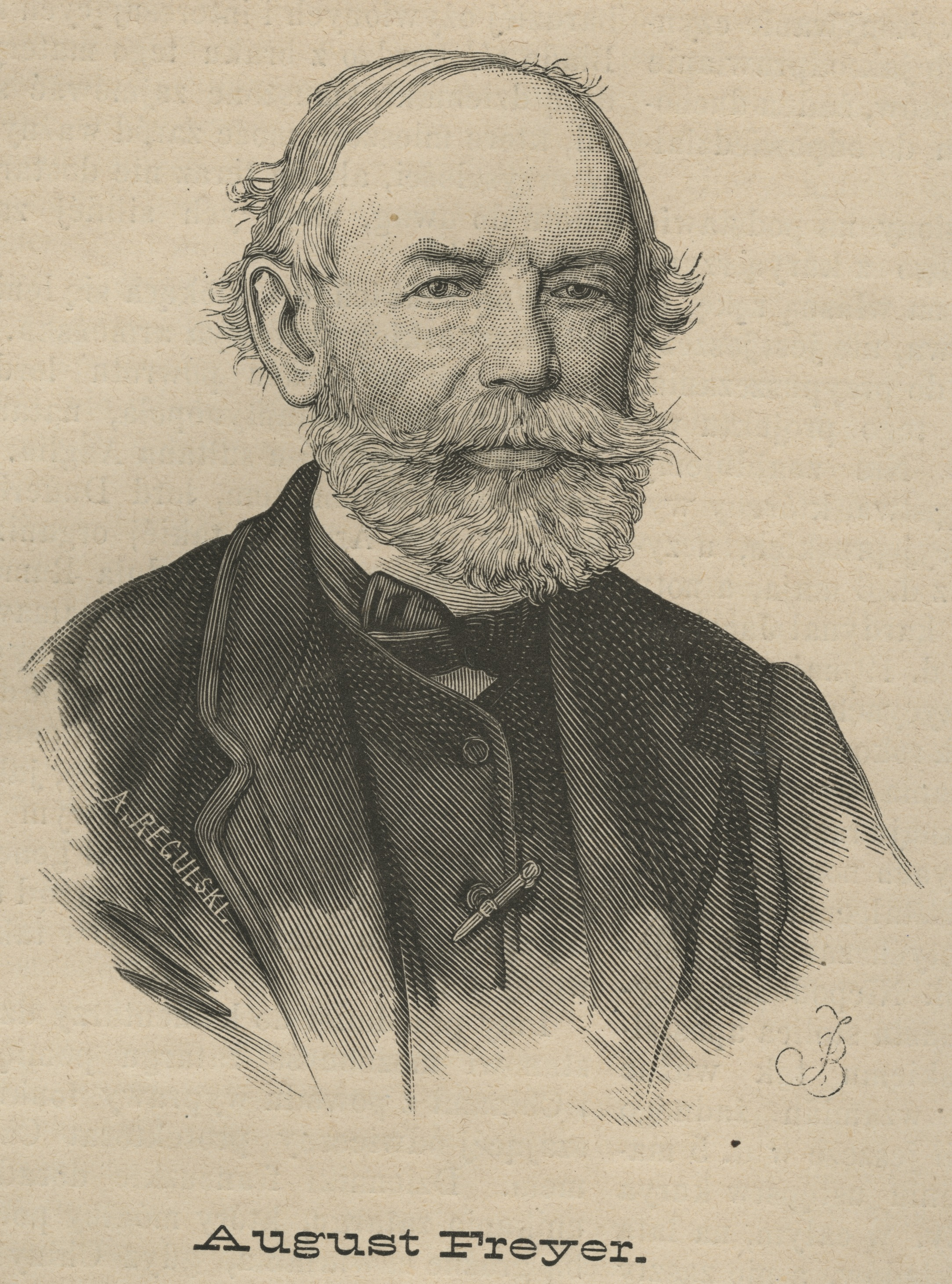
August Freyer

Karol August Freyer (15 December 1801 – 28 May 1883) was a Polish musician and composer, specializing in both performance and composition on the organ.

== Biography ==
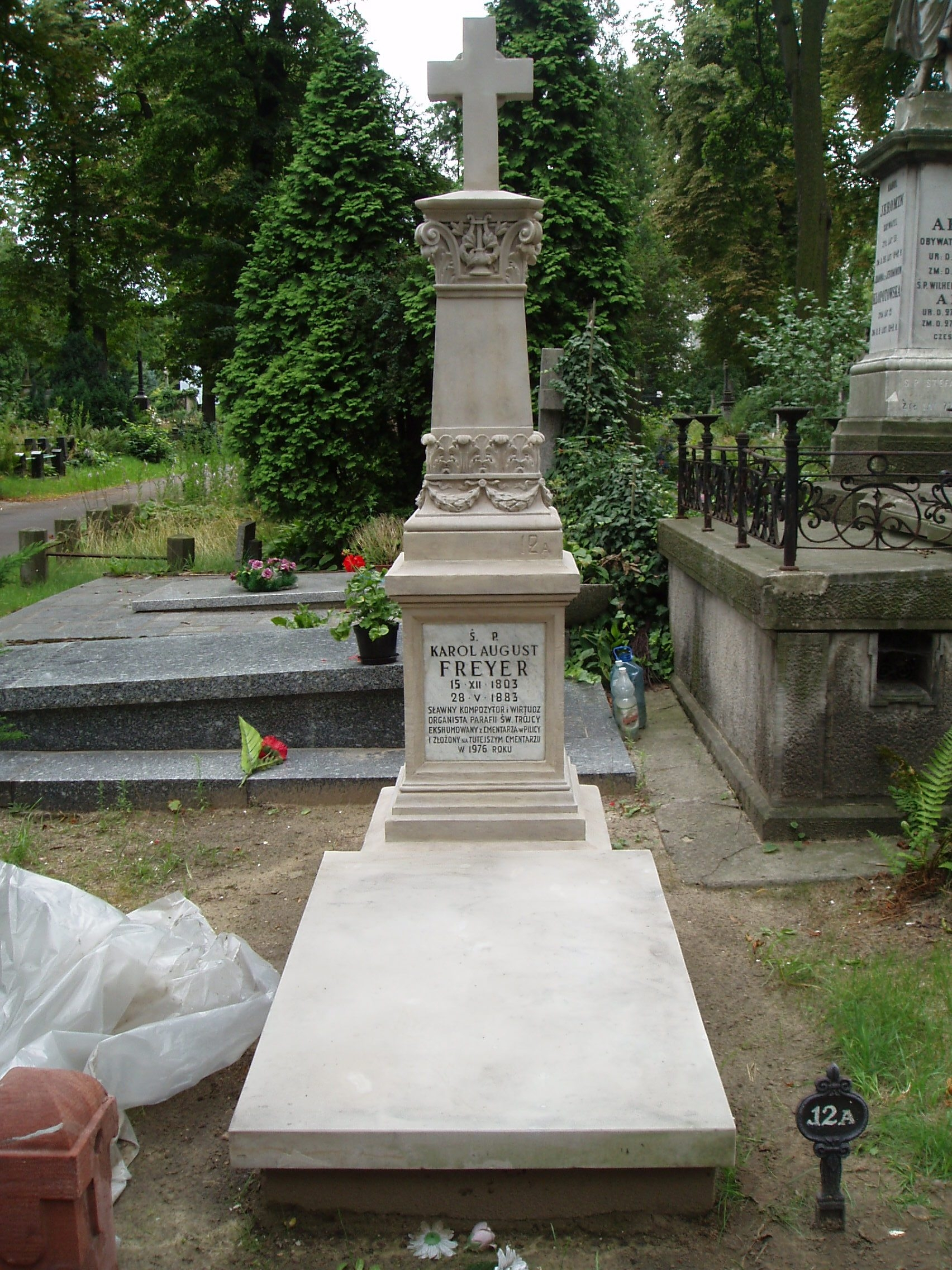
Freyer's tomb, with an incorrect birth date of 1803

Freyer was born in Saxony in 1801. He moved to Warsaw and began his musical career there as a double bass player. He became organist at the Warsaw Evangelical Church, had the organ rebuilt, and turned his church into a prominent musical location while becoming the prominent organist and organ teacher in Warsaw. He made a tour of northern Germany as an organist, from which he received wide acclaim.

He was a musical pupil of Józef Elsner. and became a close associate of Adolf Friedrich Hesse. He promoted Hesse's music to Mikhail Glinka, successful in his performance to the point of reducing his listener to tears. At an early age Stanisław Moniuszko became his pupil, his parents relocated to Warsaw to have Stanisław study with Freyer. He died in 1883.

== Style ==
Freyer was largely responsible for the revival of organ music in Poland. He was a master at music balance, both homophonic and polyphonic. His playing was appreciated by Felix Mendelssohn and Louis Spohr. In addition to the aforementioned German concerts, he toured Paris to an enthusiastic reception. His most famous composition was a set of Concert Variations of which the final-movement fugue is the most recognized.
