= Gunstwerber =

1844 waltz by Johann Strauss II

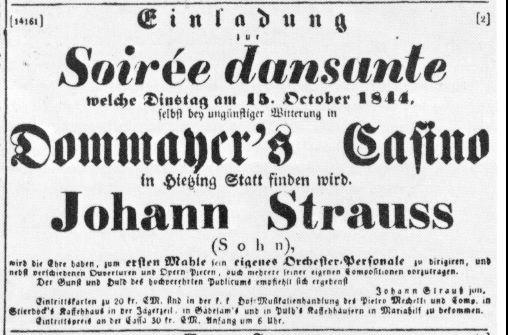
A poster advertising the début of Johann Strauss II at Dommayer's Casino

Gunstwerber (or Die Gunstwerber; English: Wooers of Favour), Op. 4, is a waltz by Johann Strauss II.

It was first played on 15 October 1844 at Strauss' début as a composer in Dommayer's Casino in Hietzing, Vienna, along with several of Strauss' other works, such as the waltz Sinngedichte and the polka Herzenslust. The music critic Ernst Décsey commented on Strauss' waltz: "As if singing had broken out from all three storeys of the house [...] the same charm, the same modest piano, the same reverberating forte as the father. Basses rumble, intermediate parts woo, and the main violin theme vibrates across to the ladies."
