= Op. 279 =

In music, Op. 279 stands for Opus number 279. Compositions that are assigned this number include:

- Josef Strauss – Hesperusbahnen
- Johann Strauss II – Morgenblätter
