= Aru Tateno =

Japanese ice dancer

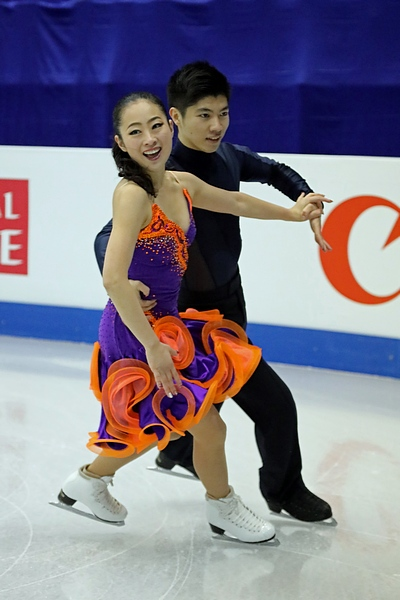
- Fukase / Tateno at the 2018 Four Continents Championships

Personal information
- Native name: 立野 在
- Born: August 29, 1997 (age 29) Yokohama, Japan
- Home town: Tokyo, Japan
- Height: 1.71 m (5 ft 7 1/2 in)

Figure skating career
- Country: Japan
- Partner: Kiria Hirayama
- Coach: Rie Arikawa
- Skating club: Kurashiki FSC
- Began skating: 2005
- Retired: January 27, 2022

Aru Tateno (Japanese: 立野 在; born August 29, 1997) is a retired Japanese ice dancer. With his former skating partner, Rikako Fukase, he has competed in the final segment at three ISU Championships. The duo placed 19th at the 2016 World Junior Championships in Debrecen, Hungary; 13th at the 2017 World Junior Championships in Taipei, Taiwan; and 11th at the 2018 Four Continents Championships in Taipei.

== Programs ==
(with Hirayama)

Season	Rhythm dance	Free dance	Exhibition
2020–2021	Sweet Charity by Cy Coleman, Dorothy Fields	Exogenesis: Symphony Part 3 from The Resistance by Muse	

(with Fukase)

Season	Short dance	Free dance	Exhibition
2017–2018	Cha Cha: Senorita Bonita by Martin Strathausen; Mambo: Tequila by Chuck Rio both performed by Tape Five; Mambo: Qué rico el mambo performed by Pérez Prado	Hello, Dolly!; The International Hello Dolly by Jerry Herman	
2016–2017	Blues: Petite Fleur by Sidney Bechet; Swing: Opus One	The King and I by Rodgers and Hammerstein	
2015–2016	Waltz: Aquarellen; Polka: Feuerfest! by Josef Strauss	Dream a Little Dream of Me; Puttin' On the Ritz	Sing, Sing, Sing by Louis Prima

== Competitive highlights ==
CS: Challenger Series; JGP: Junior Grand Prix

=== With Hirayama ===
National
Event	20–21	21–22
Japan Champ.	4th	4th
Western Sect.	2nd	
Eastern Sect.		1st
TBD = Assigned; WD = Withdrew

=== With Fukase ===
International
Event	14–15	15–16	16–17	17–18
Four Continents				11th
CS Lombardia				11th
Toruń Cup				5th
International: Junior
Junior Worlds		19th	13th	
JGP Austria		11th		
JGP Estonia			10th	
JGP Japan			6th	
Toruń Cup		3rd J	7th J	
National
Japan				3rd
Japan Junior	1st	1st	1st	
Eastern Sect.	1st J	1st J	1st J	1st
J = Junior level

=== With Maeda ===
National
Event	2013–14
Japan Junior Championships	2nd
Japan Novice Championships	1st
