= Vienna New Year's Concert =

Vienna New Year's Concert Neujahrskonzert der Wiener Philharmoniker
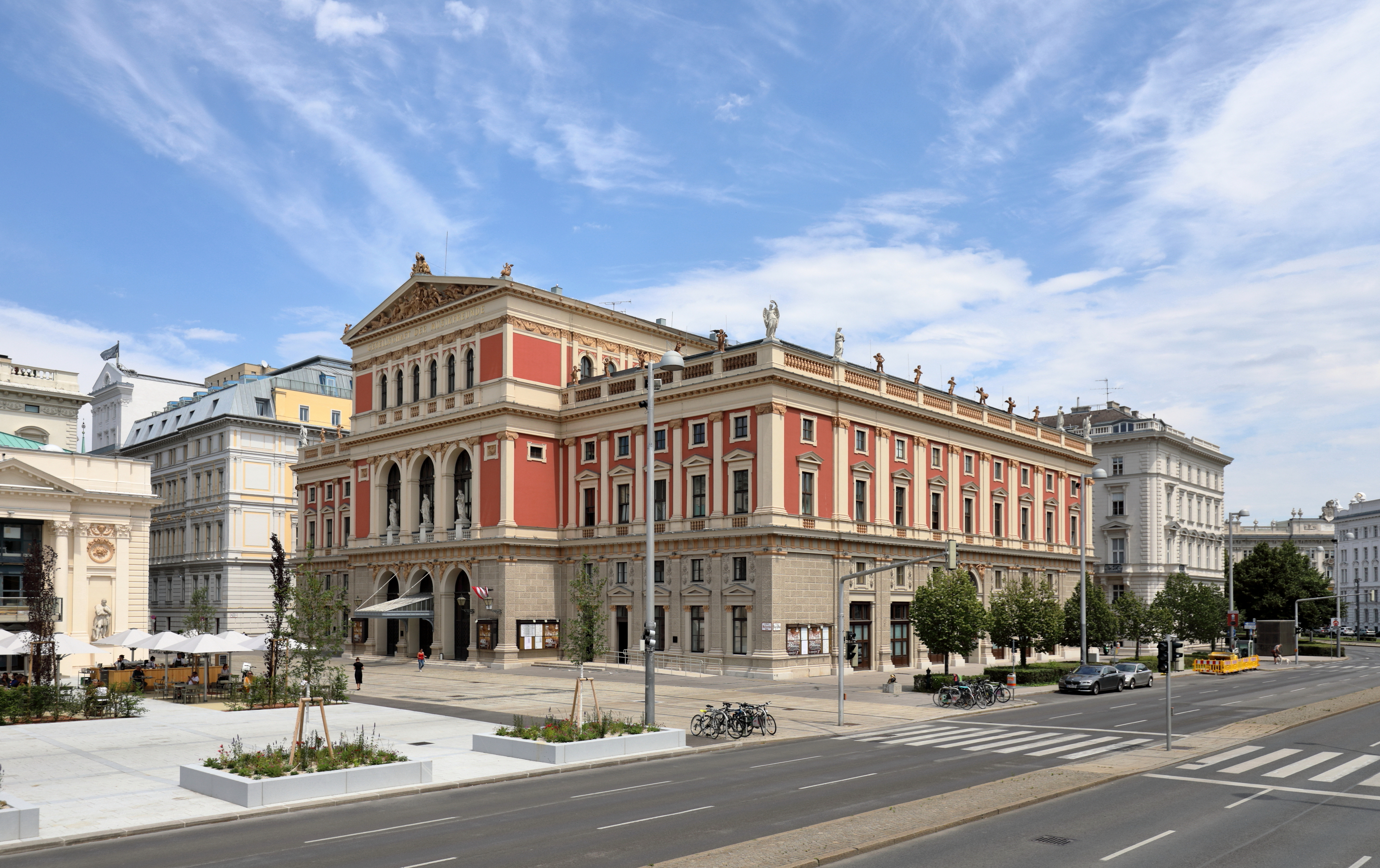
- Musikverein concert hall
- Status: Active
- Genre: Music event
- Date: 1 January
- Frequency: Annual
- Venue: Musikverein
- Location: Vienna
- Country: Austria
- Years active: 1939, 1941–present
- Inaugurated: 31 December 1939; 86 years ago
- Organiser: Musikverein

The Vienna New Year's Concert (Neujahrskonzert der Wiener Philharmoniker) is an annual concert of classical music performed by the Vienna Philharmonic on the morning of New Year's Day in Vienna, Austria. The concert occurs at the Musikverein at 11:15. The orchestra performs the same concert programme on 30 December, 31 December, and 1 January but only the last concert is broadcast every year on radio and television.

== Music and setting ==
The concert programmes always include pieces from the Strauss family—Johann Strauss I, Johann Strauss II, Josef Strauss and Eduard Strauss. On occasion, music principally of other Austrian composers, including Joseph Hellmesberger Jr., Joseph Lanner, Wolfgang Amadeus Mozart, Otto Nicolai (the Vienna Philharmonic's founder), Emil von Reznicek, Franz Schubert, Carl Zeller, Carl Millöcker, Franz von Suppé, and Carl Michael Ziehrer has featured in the programmes. In 2009, music by Joseph Haydn was played for the first time, where the 4th movement of his "Farewell" Symphony marked the 200th anniversary of his death. Other European composers such as Hans Christian Lumbye, Jacques Offenbach, Émile Waldteufel, Richard Strauss, Verdi, Wagner, and Tchaikovsky have been featured in recent programmes.

The announced programme contains approximately 14 to 20 compositions, and also three encores. The announced programme includes waltzes, polkas, mazurkas, and marches. Of the encores, the unannounced first encore is often a fast polka. The second is Johann Strauss II's waltz "The Blue Danube", whose introduction is interrupted by light applause of recognition and a New Year's greeting in German (originally added by Willi Boskovsky) from the conductor and orchestra to the audience. The origin of this tradition stems from the New Year's Concert of 1954, when the audience interrupted three pieces by enthusiastically applauding and cheering. The final encore is Johann Strauss I's Radetzky March, during which the audience claps along under the conductor's direction. This did not start until 1958. In this last piece, tradition also calls for the conductor to start the orchestra as soon as they step onto the stage, before reaching the podium. The complete duration of the event is around two and a half hours.

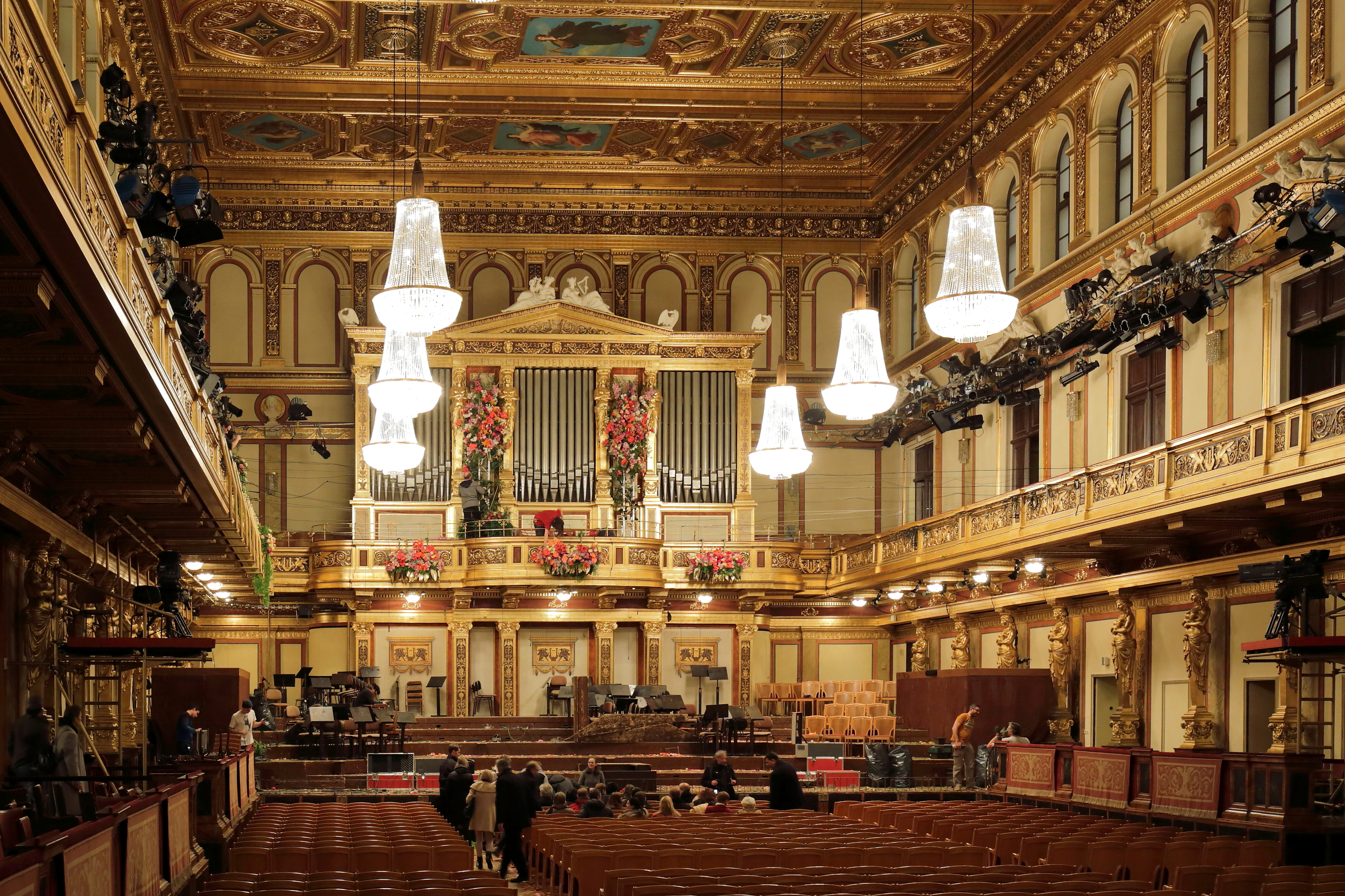
"Goldener Saal" (Golden Hall) of the Musikverein

The concerts have been held in the "Goldener Saal" (Golden Hall) of the Musikverein since 1939. The television broadcast is augmented by ballet performances in selected pieces during the second part of the programme. The dancers come from the Vienna State Ballet and dance at different famous places in Austria, e. g. Schönbrunn Palace, Schloss Esterházy, the Vienna State Opera or the Wiener Musikverein itself. In 2013, the costumes were designed by Vivienne Westwood. From 1980 until 2013, the flowers that decorated the hall were a gift from the city of Sanremo, Liguria, Italy. In 2014, the orchestra itself provided the flowers. Since 2014, the flowers have been arranged by the Wiener Stadtgärten (Vienna municipal gardens). New attire by designers Vivienne Westwood and Andreas Kronthaler debuted in 2017.

== History ==
There has been a tradition of concerts on New Year's Day in Vienna since 1838, but not with music of the Strauss family. From 1928 to 1933, there were six New Year's concerts in the Musikverein, conducted by Johann Strauss III. These concerts were broadcast by the RAVAG.

In 1939, under the supervision of Nazi Germany's propaganda minister Joseph Goebbels, conductor Clemens Krauss, with the support of Vienna Gauleiter Baldur von Schirach, devised a New Year's concert dedicated to Kriegswinterhilfswerk (Winter War Relief), as part of the Nazi propaganda efforts to improve morale at the front lines, entertain people during the war to distract from realities, raise money for the war efforts, and to present Vienna as a cultural and vibrant center of the Third reich. After World War II, this concert survived, as the Nazi origins were largely forgotten, until more recently.

The concert was first performed in 1939, and conducted by Clemens Krauss. For the first and only time, the concert was not given on New Year's Day, but instead on 31 December of that year. It was called then a special, or 'extraordinary' concert (Außerordentliches Konzert). Johann Strauss II was the only composer performed, in a modest program:

- "Morgenblätter", Op. 279, waltz
- "Annen-Polka", Op. 117
- Csárdás, from the opera Ritter Pázmán
- "Kaiser-Walzer", Op. 437
- "Leichtes Blut", Polka schnell, Op. 319
- "Egyptischer Marsch", Op. 335
- "G'schichten aus dem Wienerwald", Walzer, Op. 325
- "Pizzicato-Polka"
- "Perpetuum mobile", ein musikalischer Scherz, Op. 257
- Overture to the operetta Die Fledermaus

=== Encores ===
There were no encores in 1939, and sources indicate that encores were not instituted until 1945. Clemens Krauss almost always included "Perpetuum mobile" either on the concert or as an encore. The waltz "The Blue Danube" was not performed until 1945, and then as an encore. The "Radetzky March" was first performed in 1946, as an encore. Until 1958, these last two pieces were often but not always given as encores. Since that year, their position as twin encores has become inviolable tradition, with two exceptions:

- In 1967, Willi Boskovsky made "The Blue Danube" part of his concert program to commemorate the work's centenary; its encore position was occupied by Johann Strauss II's "Unter Donner und Blitz, polka schnell, Op. 324. Additionally, an actor impersonating the composer of the work appeared during the concert.
- In 2005, Lorin Maazel and the orchestra concluded the program with "The Blue Danube", omitting the "Radetzky March" as a mark of respect to the victims of the 2004 Indian Ocean earthquake and tsunami.

One unannounced encore, a gallop or polka schnell, is always placed before "The Blue Danube", and after the final announced work on the printed concert programme. It has also been a jocular composition.

=== Conductors ===
Boskovsky, concertmaster of the orchestra from 1939 until 1970, directed the Vienna New Year's concerts from 1955 to 1979. In 1980, Lorin Maazel became the first non-Austrian conductor of the concert. The orchestra subsequently changed practice, to choose a different conductor every year. The first such choice was Herbert von Karajan, for the 1987 concert.

- Clemens Krauss: 1939, 1941–1945, 1948–1954
- Josef Krips: 1946–1947
- Willi Boskovsky: 1955–1979
- Lorin Maazel: 1980–1986, 1994, 1996, 1999, 2005
- Herbert von Karajan: 1987
- Claudio Abbado: 1988, 1991
- Carlos Kleiber: 1989, 1992 (Note: The 1992 concert was originally going to be conducted by Leonard Bernstein, but he died, so Kleiber had to conduct again instead.)
- Zubin Mehta: 1990, 1995, 1998, 2007, 2015
- Riccardo Muti: 1993, 1997, 2000, 2004, 2018, 2021, 2025
- Nikolaus Harnoncourt: 2001, 2003
- Seiji Ozawa: 2002
- Mariss Jansons: 2006, 2012, 2016
- Georges Prêtre: 2008, 2010
- Daniel Barenboim: 2009, 2014, 2022
- Franz Welser-Möst: 2011, 2013, 2023
- Gustavo Dudamel: 2017
- Christian Thielemann: 2019, 2024
- Andris Nelsons: 2020
- Yannick Nézet-Séguin: 2026
- Tugan Sokhiev: 2027 (scheduled)

== Audience and broadcast ==
The concert is popular throughout Europe, and more recently around the world. The demand for tickets is so high that people have to pre-register one year in advance in order to participate in the drawing of tickets for the following year. Some seats are pre-registered by certain Austrian families and are passed down from generation to generation.

Map of the countries in which the New Year Concert 2019 of the Vienna Philharmonics was distributed via TV in 2019

The Austrian national broadcasting service ORF broadcasts the concert on radio and televises the concert. From 1989 to 1993, 1997 to 2009, and in 2011, the telecast was under the direction of Brian Large. The telecast is relayed via the European Broadcasting Union's Eurovision network to most major broadcasting organizations in Europe. On 1 January 2013, for example, the concert was shown on Één and La Une in Belgium, ZDF in Germany, France 2 in France, BBC Two in the United Kingdom, Rai 2 in Italy (on some hours delay), RSI La 1 in Switzerland, La 1 in Spain, ČT2 in Czechia, RTP1 in Portugal, and TVP2 in Poland, among many other channels. The concert was again televised by ORF on 1 January 2015 and 1 January 2016. Estimated audience numbers are ~50 million, in 73 countries in 2012, 93 countries in 2017 and 95 countries in 2018. Past radio presenters have included Ernst Grissemann, Paul Angerer, and Christoph Wagner-Trenkwitz. Recent radio presenters have been Albert Hosp and Eva Teimel. Past television presenters have included Grissemann, who presented the concert for 25 years, and Barbara Rett, from 2008 to 2022. The current ORF TV presenter for the concert is Teresa Vogl, beginning with the 2023 concert.

Outside Europe, the concert is also shown on PBS in the United States (beginning in 1985, as part of the performing arts anthology Great Performances, in abridged form), CCTV in China since 1987 (being telecast live since 1989, except in 1990) while also being broadcast live by CNR in China since 2013, NHK in Japan since 1973, MetroTV in Indonesia, KBS in South Korea, and SBS in Australia (until 2018, on delay). Since 2006, the concert has also been broadcast to viewers in several African countries (Botswana, Lesotho, Malawi, Mozambique, Namibia, Swaziland, Zambia and Zimbabwe). In Latin America the concert is shown in Chile by La Red, and in Guatemala, Ecuador and Bolivia. Indonesia's MetroTV broadcasts the concert although it is delayed by four to five days. The concert was broadcast for the first time in Mongolia, Mozambique, Sri Lanka and Trinidad and Tobago in 2010.

== Recent history ==
In 2021, the Vienna New Year's Concert took place without an audience, for the first time in the concert's history, because of public-health restrictions during the COVID-19 pandemic. The 2022 concert with Daniel Barenboim featured a live audience limited to 1,000 patrons, and the ORF radio transmission on Ö1 featured Eva Teimel as presenter, the first female radio presenter for ORF in the history of the concert.

The 2023 concert featured the Vienna Girls Choir (Wiener Chormädchen) in its first-ever appearance in the concert, the first female choir ever to participate in the concert. The 2025 concert included the "Fernandus-Walzer" of Constanze Geiger, in an orchestration by Wolfgang Dörner, the first music by a female composer ever programmed in the Vienna Philharmonic's New Year's Day concert. The 2026 concert included the "Sirenen Lieder" of Josephine Amann-Weinlich and the "Rainbow Waltz" of Florence Price, in orchestrations by Wolfgang Dörner, the second time that the concert has featured music by female composers and the first time that the concert has featured more than one female composer. The inclusion of the Florence Price selection also marks the first appearance of music by a composer outside of Europe and by a composer of colour.

== Commercial recordings ==
A commercial recording has been made for every concert from 1987, the more recent being released within a matter of days of the event.

Decca Records made the first of the live commercial recordings in 1975. The 1979 digital recording was the label's first digital LP release, marking Boskovsky's last appearance. The recordings made with Maazel in 1980, 1981, 1982 and 1983 did not specify the year on the album cover (opting instead for the titles, New Year's in Vienna, New Year's Concert, Prosit Neujahr! and Wiener Bonbons respectively). The 1983 concert also marked the first simultaneous CD release (all the earlier concerts would follow as CD reissues). The Karajan recording was similarly undated on the cover, being entitled Neujahrskonzert in Wien. Only with the first Abbado concert in 1988 was the year specified, which has been the case on each release thereafter.

Recording label	Years recorded
Decca Records	1975, 1979, 2008–2011
Deutsche Grammophon	1980–1983, 1987–1988, 1991, 2003–2007
Sony Classical Records	1989–1990, 1992, 1994–1995, 2012–2025
Philips Classics Records	1993, 2002
BMG	1996, 1998–1999
EMI	1997, 2000
Teldec	2001

== Other New Year's concerts in Vienna ==
The Vienna Hofburg Orchestra's traditional New Year's Eve Concert takes place on 31 December in the halls of the Hofburg Palace. The program features waltz and operetta melodies by Johann Strauss, Emmerich Kálmán, Franz Lehár and opera arias by Wolfgang Amadeus Mozart. The all-female chamber ensemble La Philharmonica gave its inaugural concert on 1 January 2025, with selections by Leopoldine Blahetka, Gisela Frankl, Constanze Geiger, Joseph Hellmesberger Jr., Mathilde Kralik, Johann Strauss II, Maria Anna Stubenberg, and Josephine Amann-Weinlich.
