= The Eternal Waltz =

1954 German film

- Directed by: Paul Verhoeven
- Written by: Alexander Lix; Hanns Marschall; Friedrich Schreyvogl; Ruth Charlotte Silbermann; Paul Verhoeven
- Produced by: Carl Wilhelm Tetting
- Starring: Bernhard Wicki; Hilde Krahl; Annemarie Düringer
- Cinematography: Franz Koch
- Edited by: Gertrud Hinz-Nischwitz
- Music by: Alois Melichar
- Production company: Rotary-Film
- Distributed by: Deutsche London-Film; Sascha Film (Austria)
- Release date: 17 December 1954
- Running time: 97 minutes
- Country: West Germany
- Language: German

The Eternal Waltz (German: Ewiger Walzer) is a 1954 West German drama film dramatizing the life of Johann Strauss II. The initial story was written by Hanns Marschall and Ruth Charlotte Silbermann, and the film itself was written by Alexander Lix; the adaptation was by Paul Verhoeven who also directed the film.

It was shot at the Bavaria Studios in Munich and on location in Vienna. The film's sets were designed by the art director Franz Bi and Bruno Monden.

== Cast ==
- Bernhard Wicki as Johann Strauss II
- Hilde Krahl as Henrietta Treffz
- Annemarie Düringer as Adele
- Friedl Loor as Marie Geistinger
- Lis van Essen as Olga
- Willy Trenk-Trebitsch as Leibrock, Valet
- Hans Putz as Alexander Girardi
- Ulrich Bettac as Director Steiner
- Arnulf Schröder as Jacques Offenbach
- Hermann Thimig as Carl Haslinger
- Leonard Steckel as Baron Carlo Todesco
- Michael Toost as Baron Victor Todesco
- Eduard Strauss Jr. as Eduard Strauss
- Josef Hendrichs as Josef Strauss
- Elisabeth Neumann-Viertel as Mother Strauß
- Waldemar Frahm as Anton, First Violinist
- Alma Seidler as Fürstin Metternich
- Gert Fröbe as Gawrinoff
- Ellen Hille as Anastasia
- Claus Biederstaedt as Gregor
- Erik Frey as Kaiser Franz Josef
- Harry Hardt as Professor Billroth
- Maria Eis as Princess Metternich
- Karlheinz Böhm

== Bibliography ==
- Bock, Hans-Michael; Bergfelder, Tim, eds. (2009). The Concise Cinegraph: Encyclopaedia of German Cinema. New York: Berghahn Books. ISBN 978-1-57181-655-9.
