= Dynamiden =

Viennese Waltz

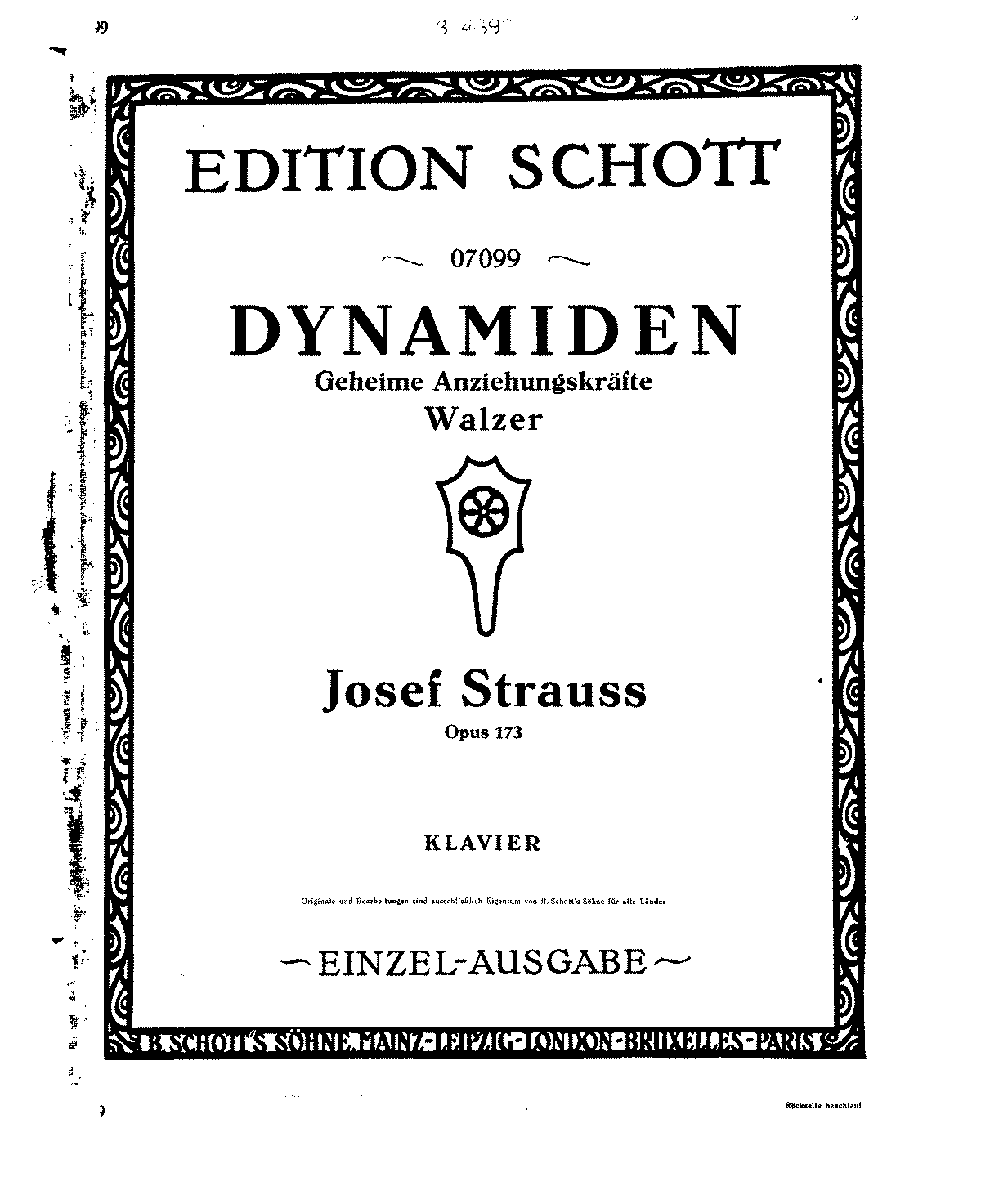
Cover of piano-score

Dynamiden op. 173 is a Viennese Waltz composed by Josef Strauss in 1865. Its subtitle is Geheime Anziehungskräfte ('Mysterious Powers of Magnetism').

Richard Strauss drew inspiration from Dynamiden when composing the "Ohne mich" waltz in Act II of his comic opera Der Rosenkavalier.

Waltz 1

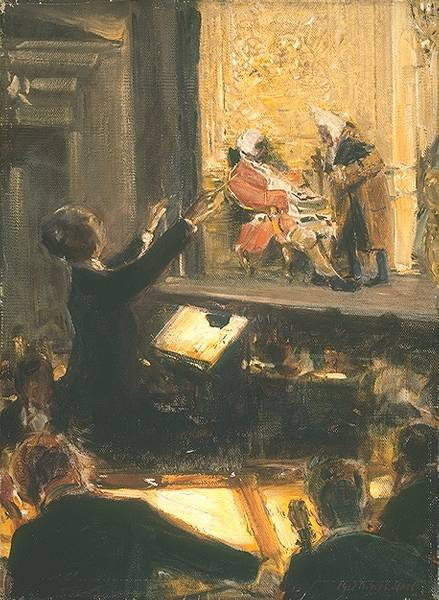
Waltz 1 was used in the music of the opera "Der Rosenkavalier".

== Vienna New Year's Concert ==
The advent of the Vienna New Year's Concertis as follows.

- 1949 – Clemens Krauss
- 1967 – Willi Boskovsky
- 1971 – Willi Boskovsky
- 1997 – Riccardo Muti
- 2007 – Zubin Mehta
- 2014 – Daniel Barenboim
- 2020 - Andris Nelsons
