= Op. 173 =

In music, Op. 173 stands for Opus number 173. Compositions that are assigned this number include:

- Czerny – Piano Trio No. 3 (Troisième Grand Trio)
- Strauss – Dynamiden
- Wolff – Kleine Erzählungen
