= Eduard Strauss II =

Austrian conductor (1910-69)

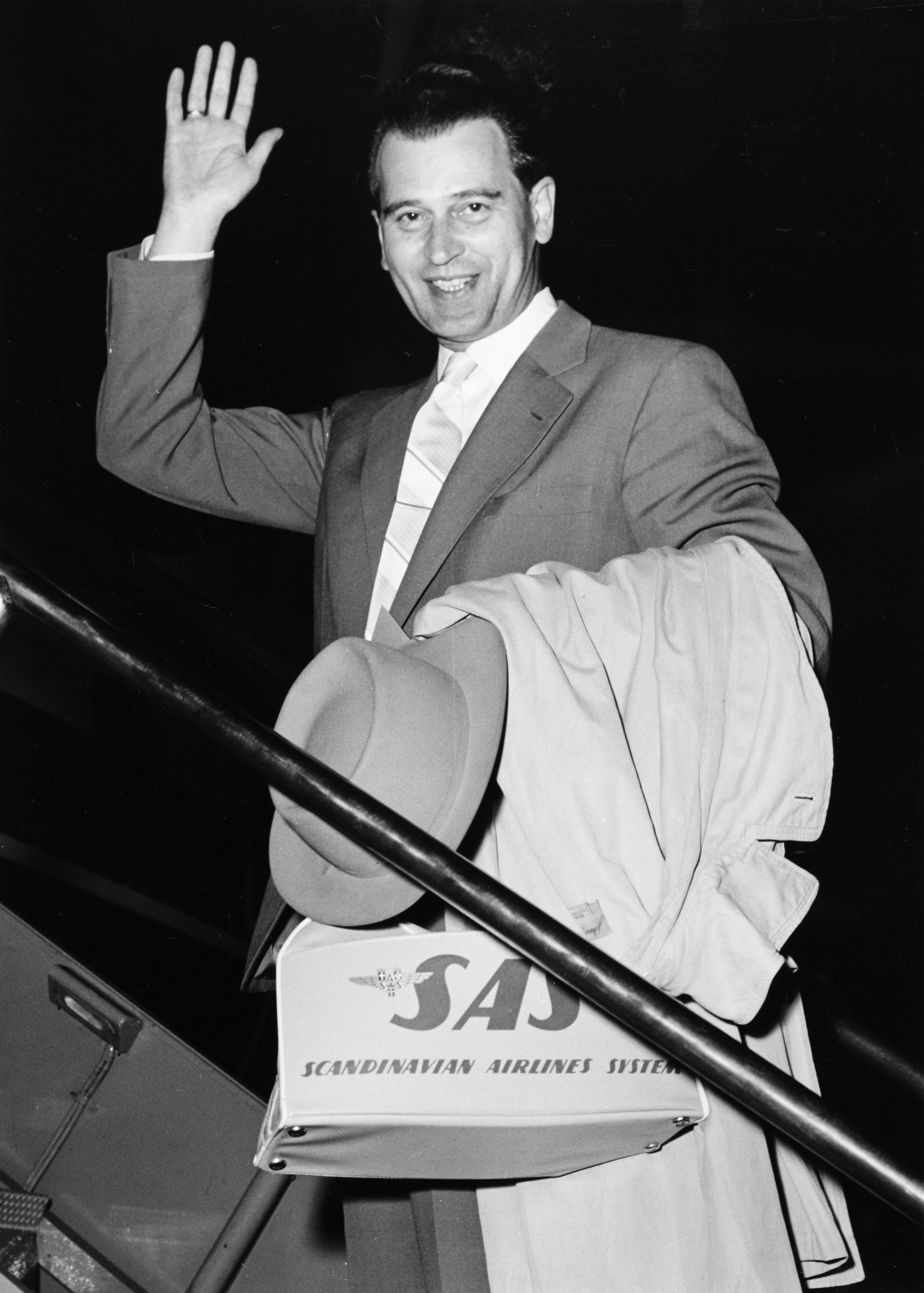
- In Copenhagen Airport, 1958
- Born: Vienna, Austria-Hungary
- Baptised: March 24, 1910
- Died: 27 April 1969 (aged 59); Vienna, Austria
- Occupation: Conductor
- Relatives: Julius Epstein (adoptive second cousin); Johann Strauss VI (first cousin once removed); Johann Strauss IV (cousin)

Eduard Leopold Maria Strauss (March 24, 1910 – April 6, 1969), commonly known as Eduard Strauss II to distinguish him from his grandfather, was an Austrian conductor whose grandfather was Eduard Strauss I and whose uncle was Johann Strauss III.

He enrolled at University of Music and Performing Arts, Vienna, and learned composition technique from Franz Schmidt. He debuted as a conductor in 1949, 50 years after the death of Johann Strauss II, and 100 years after the death of Johann Strauss I.

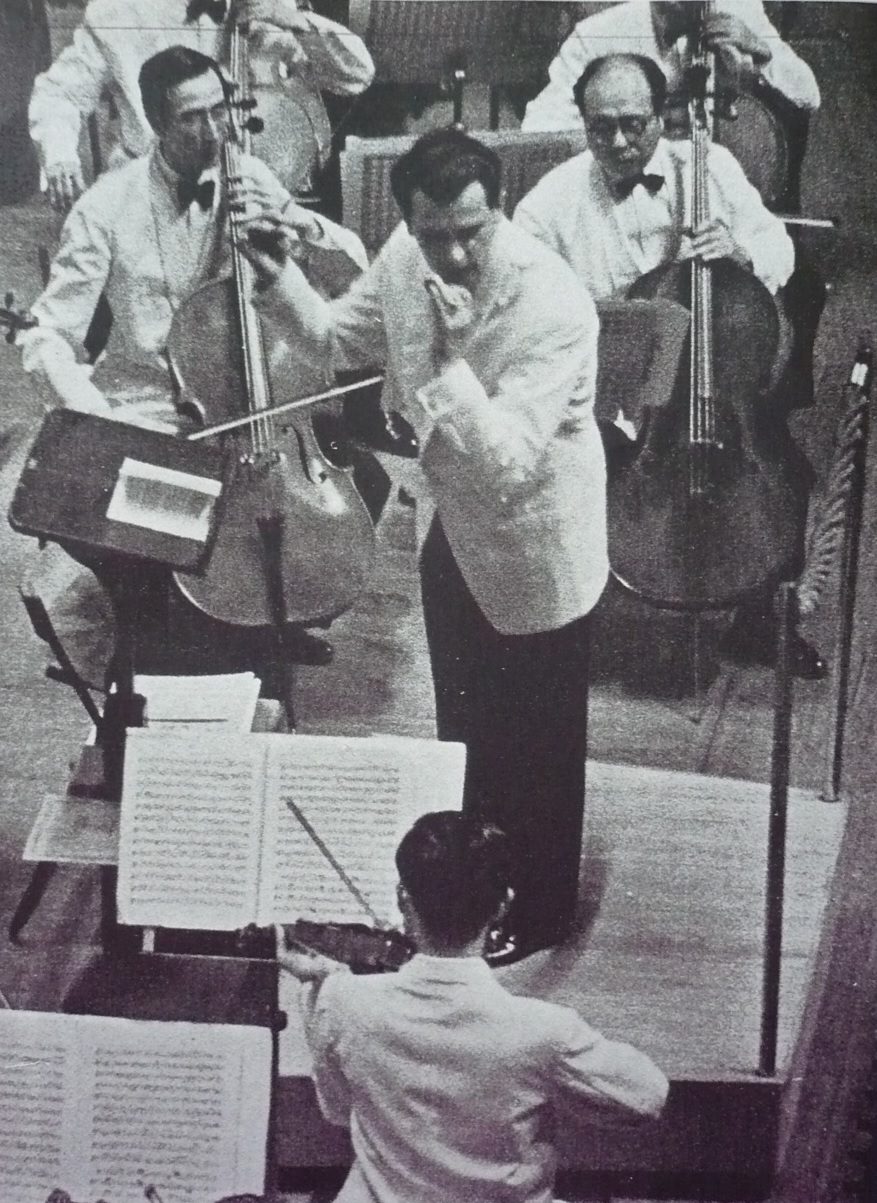
Eduard II. and Tokyo Symphony Orchestra (30 July 1956)

Eduard II visited Japan in 1956. His works drew enormous attention, which resulted in a Johann Strauss boom occurring in Japan.

He organized the Wiener Johann Strauss Orchester in 1966.

His son, Eduard Strauss III (born 1955), is the current head of the Strauss family.

== Filmography ==
In 1954, Eduard II appeared in three movies as Eduard Strauss Jr.

- Victoria in Dover – a composer.
- The Eternal Waltz – Eduard Strauss I.
- Der Komödiant von Wien – Johann Strauss II.
