= Museum der Johann-Strauss-Dynastie =

Museum in Vienna, Austria

Coordinates: 48.2200°N 16.3627°E

Museum of the Johann-Strauss-Dynasty
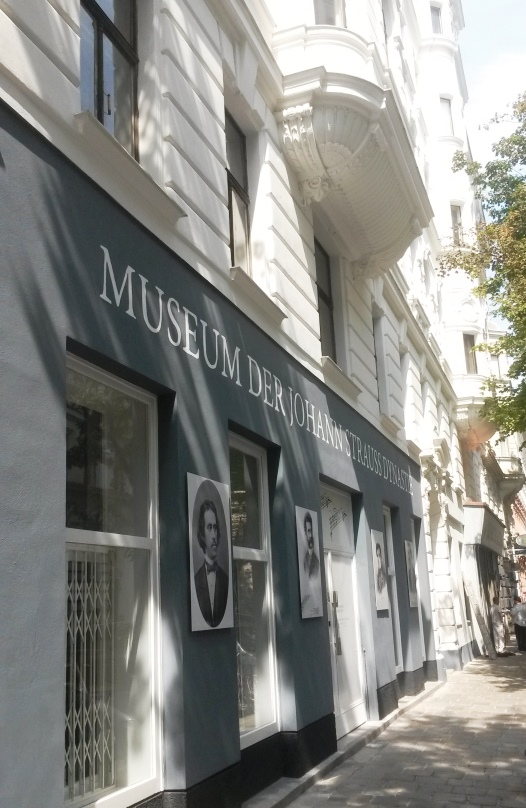
- Established: 2015
- Location: Vienna, Austria
- Website: www.strauss-museum.at

The Museum of the Johann Strauss Dynasty (Strauss Museum) in Vienna is a museum dedicated to the Strauss family: Johann I, Johann II, Josef, Eduard and Johann III.

== Museum ==
The Museum of the Strauss Dynasty was founded by the private association Kulturverein Wiener Blut and presents many items from the collection of the association, as well as items loaned by the Strauss family and others. Following a special preview evening on 15 March 2015, it was opened to the general public on 18 March.

Across seven rooms, visitors can learn biographical detail of all members of the Strauss family, as well as the historical and sociological background of Vienna in the 19th century. "Listening stations" in each room permit the visitor to hear pieces of music relevant to the information displayed.

The museum is located at Müllnergasse 3, A-1090 Vienna.

== Gallery ==
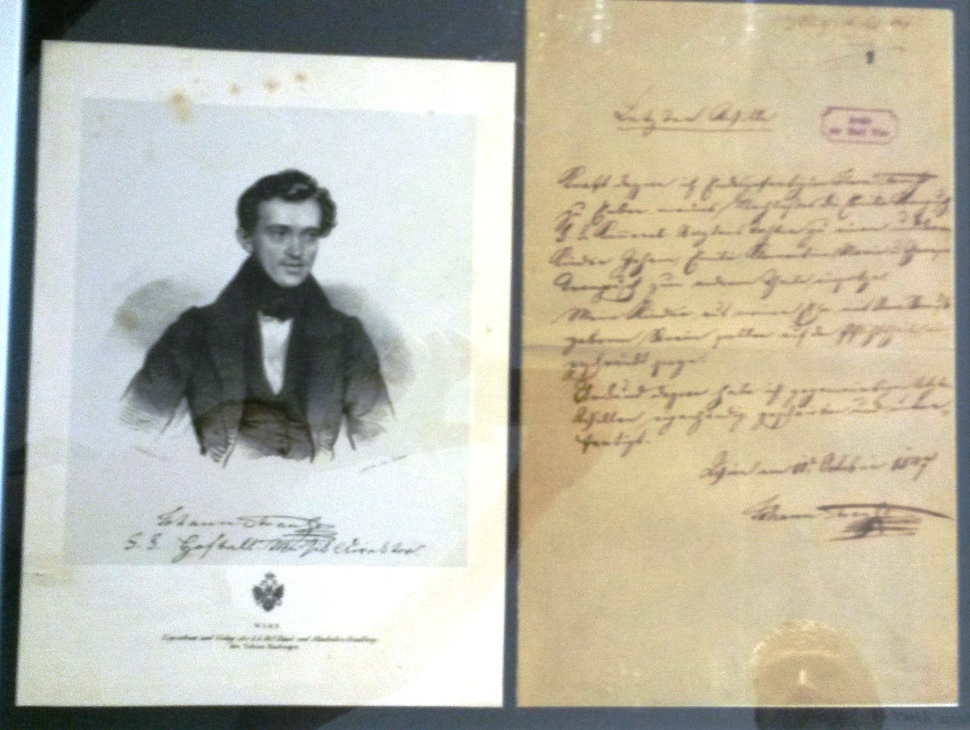
Last will of Johann Strauss I

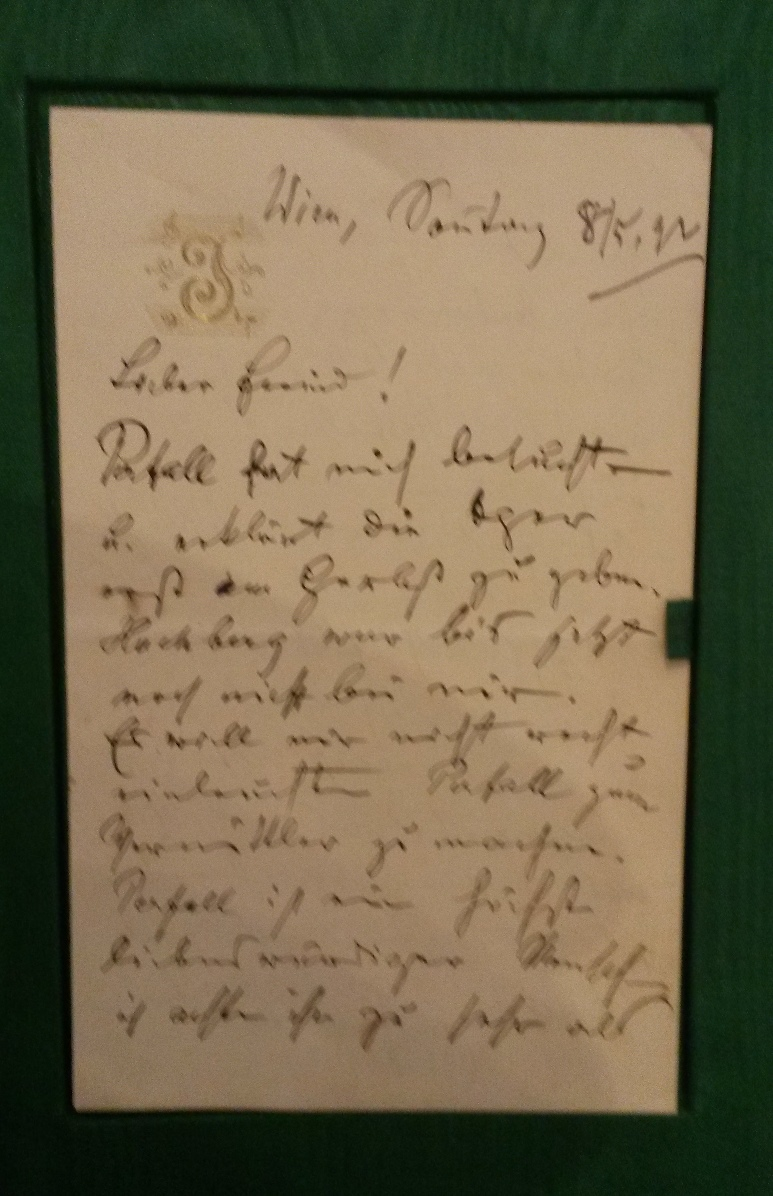
Letter from Johann Strauss II

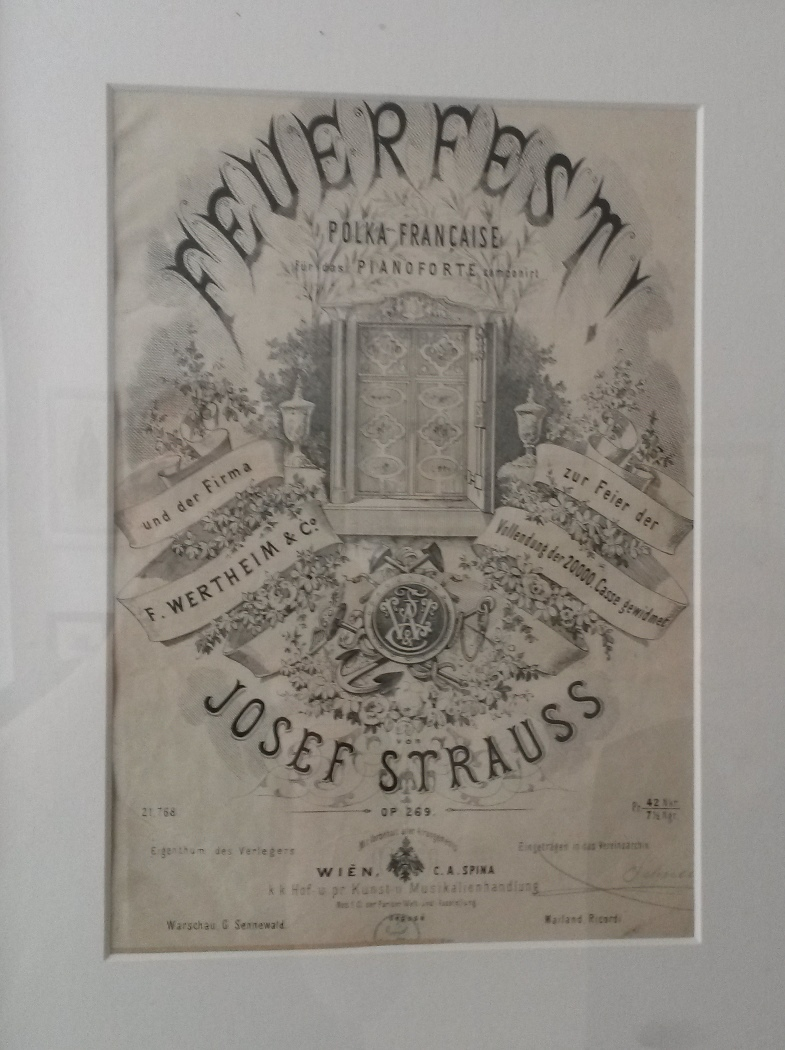
Feuerfestpolka by Josef Strauss

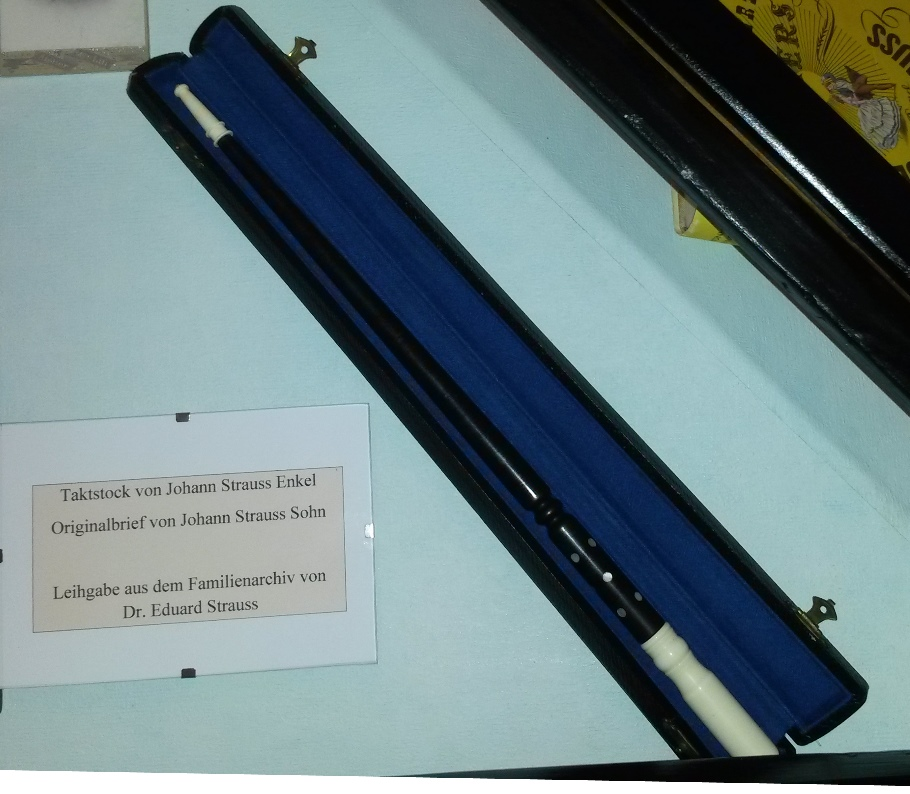
Baton of Johann Strauss III

== See also ==
- List of music museums
