= Wiener Johann Strauss Orchester =

Orchestra based in Vienna, Austria

Wiener Johann Strauss Orchester (Vienna Johann Strauss Orchestra) is an Austrian orchestra based in Vienna.

The orchestra was formed under the auspices of Professor Oskar Goger and the ORF (Austrian Radio) in 1966. Eduard Strauss II, nephew of Johann Strauss III, who carried on the Strauss dynasty musical tradition into the 20th century, was the orchestra's first conductor.

The primary aim of this orchestra is to recreate the touring Strauss Orchestra of the days of Johann Strauss I, who was the founder of the Strauss musical dynasty. The members of the orchestra were selected from leading Vienna orchestras such as the Vienna Symphony Orchestra and the Vienna Radio Orchestra so that its quality would be first-rate.

Eduard Leopold (better known as Eduard Strauss II) took this orchestra for a tour in North America in October 1966 and success followed until his death in 1969. Willi Boskovsky was then chosen as principal conductor of the orchestra and recorded much of the Strauss family music with this orchestra on the EMI record label.

As of 2021 its conductors were Alfred Eschwé and Martin Sieghart. Franz Bauer-Theussl also conducted the orchestra at some point after Boskovsky's death. Johannes Wildner has been conducting the orchestra at the Musikverein in Vienna on Austria's national day since 2008.
