= Hesperusbahnen =

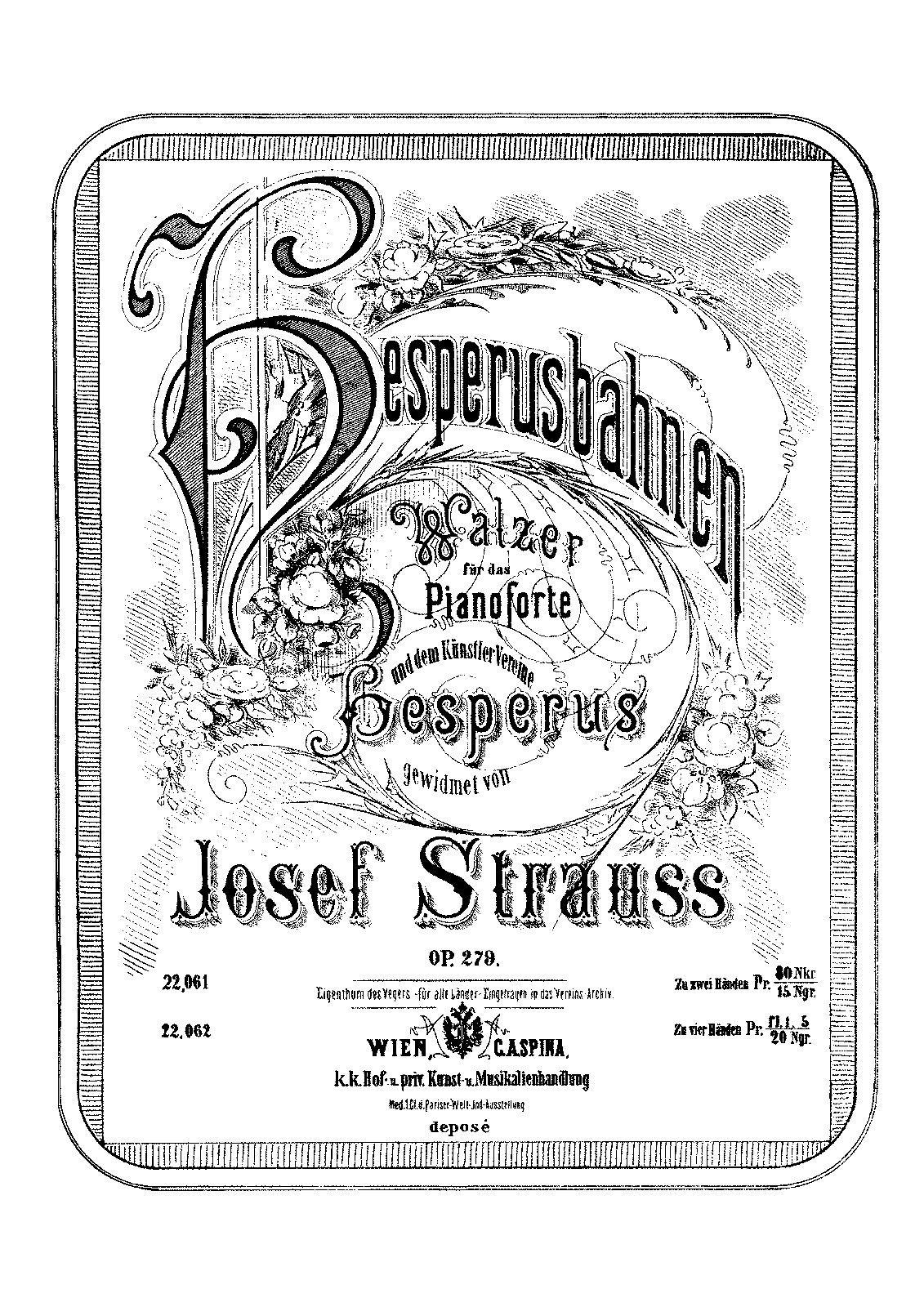
Cover picture of the piano score.

Hesperusbahnen (Hesperus’ Path) op. 279 is a Viennese Waltz composed by Josef Strauss.

This work was premiered in Musikverein on April 4 1870. Dedication destination was the vienna Artists Association „Hesperus (Venus)“. Song Title has two meanings of Venus′s orbit and Artists Association′s history.

Vienna newspaper Morgen-Post said on 6 April 1870,

"Josef Strauss dedicated one of his most stirring compositions to the holiday ball, entitled Hesperusbahnen."

Josef had died suddenly in the three months after the premiere. Therefore, this waltz is called the "Josef Strauss’s last masterpiece."

Introduction.

== Vienna New Year's Concert ==
The advent of the Vienna New Year's Concertis as follows.

- 2013 – Franz Welser-Möst

== Bibliography ==
- CD „The Best of Josef STRAUSS“ – [4] Hesperus-bahnen. Walzer (Hesperus’ Path. Waltz), Op. 279
- CD „Josef Strauss (1827-1870) Edition Vol. 7“ – [10] Hesperus-bahnen. Walzer (Hesperus’ Path. Waltz), Op. 279
