= Feuerfest! =

Polka française by Josef Strauss

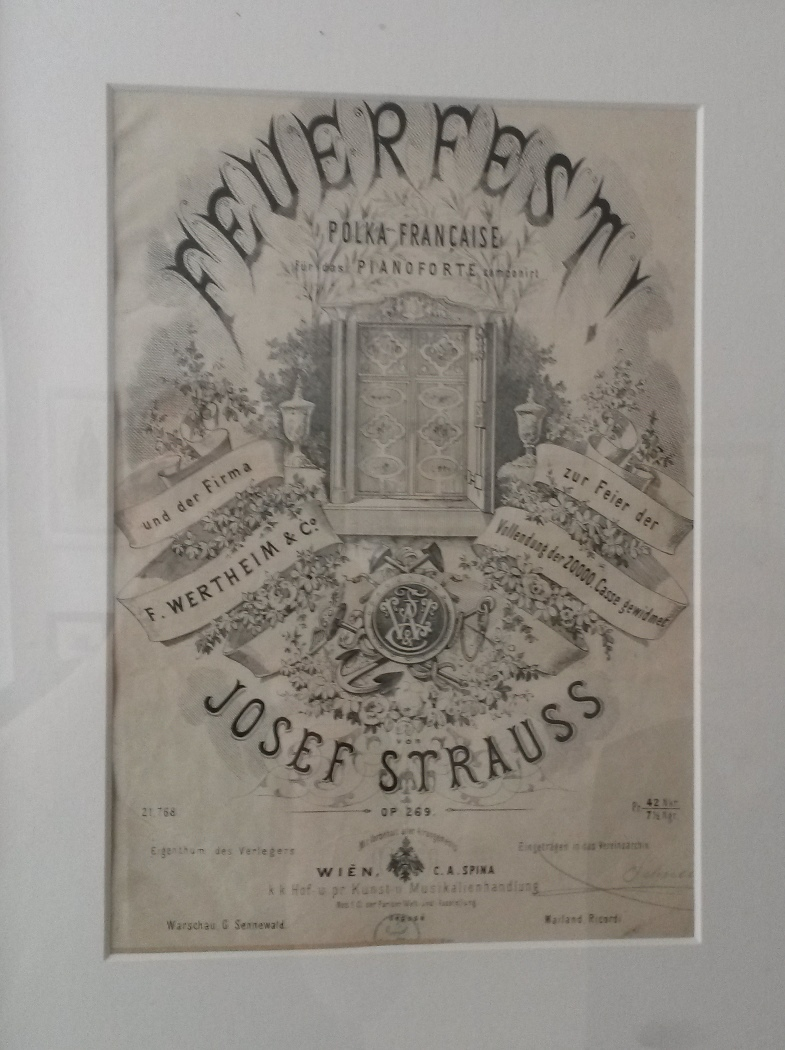
Piano score

Feuerfest! ('Fireproof!'), Op. 269, is a polka-française composed by Josef Strauss in 1869.

== History ==
The "Feuerfest!" (German for 'fireproof') polka was composed by Josef Strauss as a commission by the Wertheim company. Franz von Wertheim's company produced safes that were marketed as fireproof and Wertheim was known to demonstrate that particular claim by placing his safes in bonfires. The "Feuerfest!" polka was commissioned in 1869 to celebrate the highly successful company's 20,000th safe. The orchestration includes an anvil, and at various points the score directs the percussionist to strike the anvil with a hammer, recalling the making and solidity of the safe.

== Music ==
Incipit of a piano reduction.

== Text ==
Most performances of the "Feuerfest!" polka are done without a choir, but the following text from Rudolf Effenberger has been used on several occasions by the Vienna Boys' Choir.

Sagt der Amboss zu dem schweren Hammer:
"Warum trifft mich denn dein Schlag so hart?
Lieber Hammer, schau, beacht', bedenke,
wir sind beide doch von gleicher Art."

Dieses alte Sprichwort las ich einmal,
und es kommt mir klug und weise vor,
aufgeschrieben, schön und fein verzieret
über einer Schmiede Tor.

Und der Hammer sprach: "Wir beide sind ja
von Eisen und von Stahl.
Klopf' ich fest auf deinen Rücken, dann
gibt es frohen Widerhall."

Leuchtend rot und heiss erstrahlt es im Feuer,
Blasebalg bläst ein.
Und der Hammer, der schlägt drauf!
Und der Amboss, der schreit auf!

Schlag drauf mit aller Kraft,
schlag mit dem Hammer drein!
Das Eisen muss behauen sein.

So schlägt der Hammer auf den Amboss,
auf das heisse und das harte Eisen.
Schlägt und klopft, dass die Funken fliegen,
doch das heisse Eisenstück ist feuerfest!

Am Werktag ist ein jeder Schmiedgesell
verrusst, teufelschwarz hinein bis in das Fell.
Die Hände, Haare, auch das Gesicht
sieht man voller Russ, voller Staub fast nicht.

Am Sonntag ist er sauber und rein,
geputzt wie die grossen Herren fein.
Im neuen Rock, die Schuhe frisch gelackt,
so tanzt mit dem Mädel er im Polkatakt.

Wie froh ist der Hammerschmiedgeselle
wenn er den Hammer schwingt.
Leuchten seine Augen helle,
wenn hell das Eisen klingt.
Mit Schwung wendet er das Eisen schnelle,
damit es gut gelingt!
Hat er es fertig dann
kommt schon ein neues dran,
lustig fängt er wieder dann zu hämmern an.

Coda:
Feuerfest! Klang! Klang! Klang!

Says the anvil to the heavy hammer
"Why does your beating hit me so hard?
Dear hammer, please think about this,
We are one of a kind."

I read this old saying once,
and it seems very wise to me,
it was engraved and beautifully adorned
above a smithy.

The hammer said: "We are both
made of iron, of steel.
If I hit your backside hard,
There is a lovely echo."

Bright red and hot (the iron) shines in the fire,
the bellows blow air.
The hammer hits hard,
The anvil screams in return.

Hit with all your might,
Hit with the hammer.
The iron must be forged.

And the hammer hits the anvil,
Hits the hot and hard iron.
Hits and beats so hard sparks fly,
But the hot iron is fireproof.

On a work day, each apprentice
is black with soot all over his skin.
Hands, hair, the entire face
Obscured by soot and dust.

On Sundays, he is clean and bright as a button,
turned out like a gentleman.
With a new coat, freshly polished shoes,
He dances the polka with his girl.

How happy is the smith's apprentice
When he uses the hammer.
His eyes shine
At the clanging sound of the iron.
He turns the iron over quickly,
To ensure the best results.
Once he is done
He takes the next piece,
And begins to hammer again cheerfully.

Coda:
Fireproof! Ding! Ding! Ding!

== Vienna New Year's Concert ==
The polka was played at these Vienna New Year's Concerts:

- 1951 – Clemens Krauss
- 1962 – Willi Boskovsky
- 1968 – Willi Boskovsky
- 1971 – Willi Boskovsky
- 1982 – Lorin Maazel（with Vienna Boys' Choir）
- 1992 – Carlos Kleiber
- 1994 – Lorin Maazel
- 2012 – Mariss Jansons (with Vienna Boys' Choir）

== Social Dance choreography ==
Richard Powers has created a contemporary choreography called Bohemian National Polka, which is very popular in historical and social dancing circles.
