= Unter den Linden (waltz) =

Waltz by Johann Strauss III

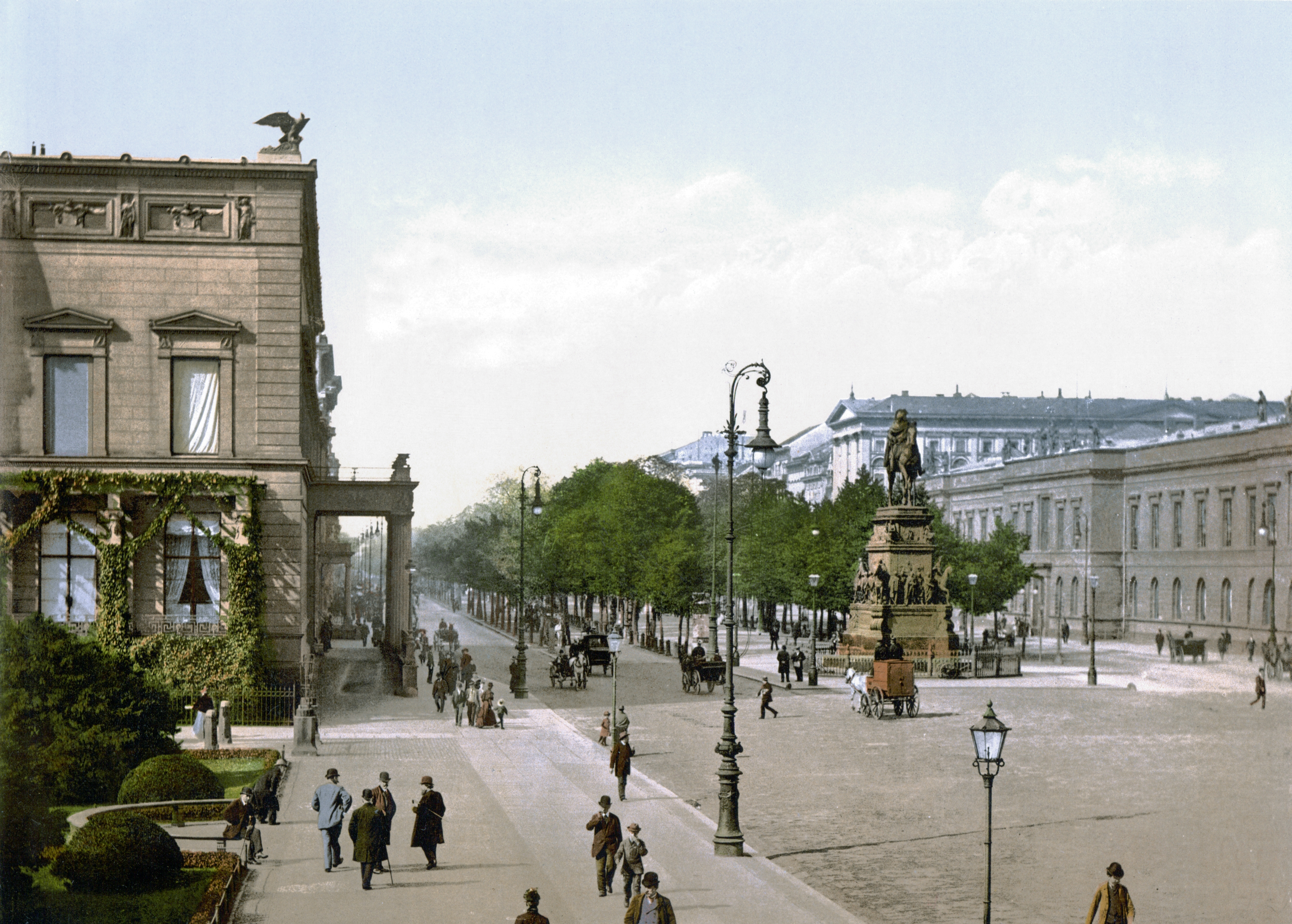
In Unter den Linden, c. 1900

Unter den Linden ("Under the Linden Trees") op. 30 is a waltz by Johann Strauss III first performed by the composer on June 2, 1900.

Johann III undertook a five-month Concert tour of Germany and the Netherlands in 1900. Johann III wrote to his friend on 23 March 1900:

"Now I intend to write a waltz for Berlin and call it "Unter den Linden" since curiously enough this title has not yet been used."

This work was premiered in Neues Königliches Opernhaus Berlin on June 2, 1900. This waltz is a representative work of Johann III. It has been occasionally programmed since, including a 2015 performance and CD.

== Bibliography ==
- CD„ Vienna Premiere, Vol. 3“ – Unter den Linden. walzer (Under the Linden Trees. Waltz) Op. 30
- Berlin Development Designed to Hold Its Own With History – by Richard Holledgedec. December. 3, 2015
