= Die Libelle =

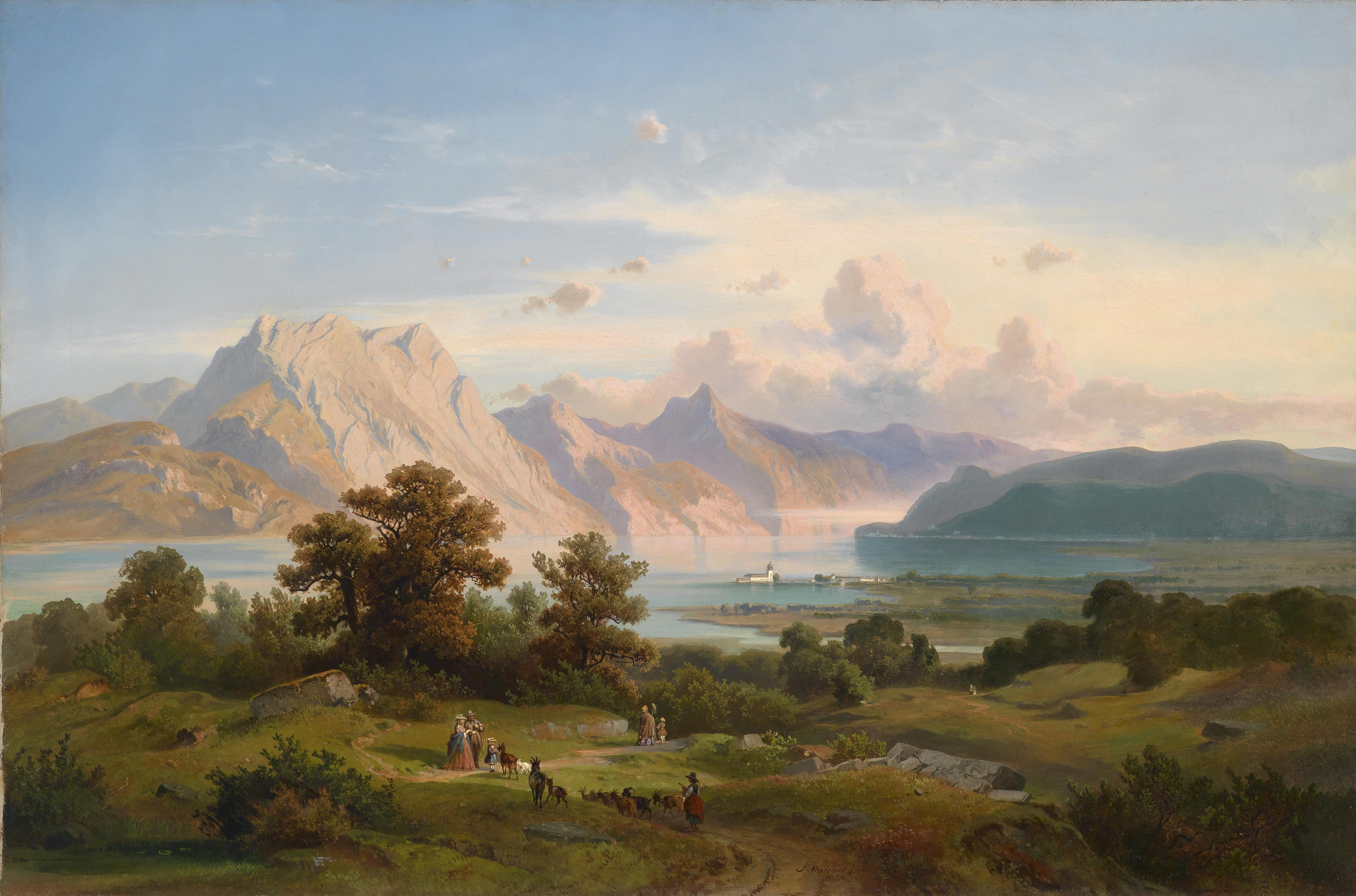
Scene of Traunstein and Traunsee in 1863.

Die Libelle (The Dragonfly) Op. 204 is a polka-mazurka composed by Josef Strauss in 1866.

== Background ==
Josef Strauss and his wife Caroline visited Traunstein and lake Traunsee in 1866. At that time, Josef saw dragonflies flying on the water surface. Inspired by this experience, he composed the polka-mazurka Die Libelle.

This work was premiered on 21 October 1866, immediately after the Austro-Prussian War, when the Austrian mood was still gloomy following its defeat.

== Brahms's recording ==
Brahms plays Die Libelle
2 December 1889

Die Libelle was recorded by Johannes Brahms, together with his own Hungarian Dance no. 1 in 1889. The recording was severely damaged in World War II.
