= Willi Boskovsky =

Austrian violinist and conductor

Willibald Karl Boskovsky (16 June 1909 – 21 April 1991) was an Austrian violinist and conductor, best known as the long-standing conductor of the Vienna New Year's Concert from 1955 to 1979.

== Biography ==
Boskovsky was born in Vienna, and joined the Vienna Academy of music at the age of nine. He was the concertmaster of the Vienna Philharmonic from 1939 to 1971. He was also, from 1955, the conductor of the Vienna New Year's Concert, which is mostly devoted to the music of Johann Strauss II and his contemporaries. Along with the Vienna Philharmonic, he was also the chief conductor of the Wiener Johann Strauss Orchester up until his death. A forerunner of this ensemble was the 19th-century Strauss Orchestra founded by Johann Strauss I in 1835. He died in Visp, Switzerland.

In chamber ensemble he led the Boskovsky Quartet with Philipp Matheis (2nd violin), Gunther Breitenbach (viola) and Nikolaus Hübner (violoncello). The Boskovsky Quartet, together with Johann Krump (double-bass), Alfred Boskovsky (clarinet), Josef Veleba (horn) and Rudolf Hanzl (bassoon) formed the Vienna Octet.

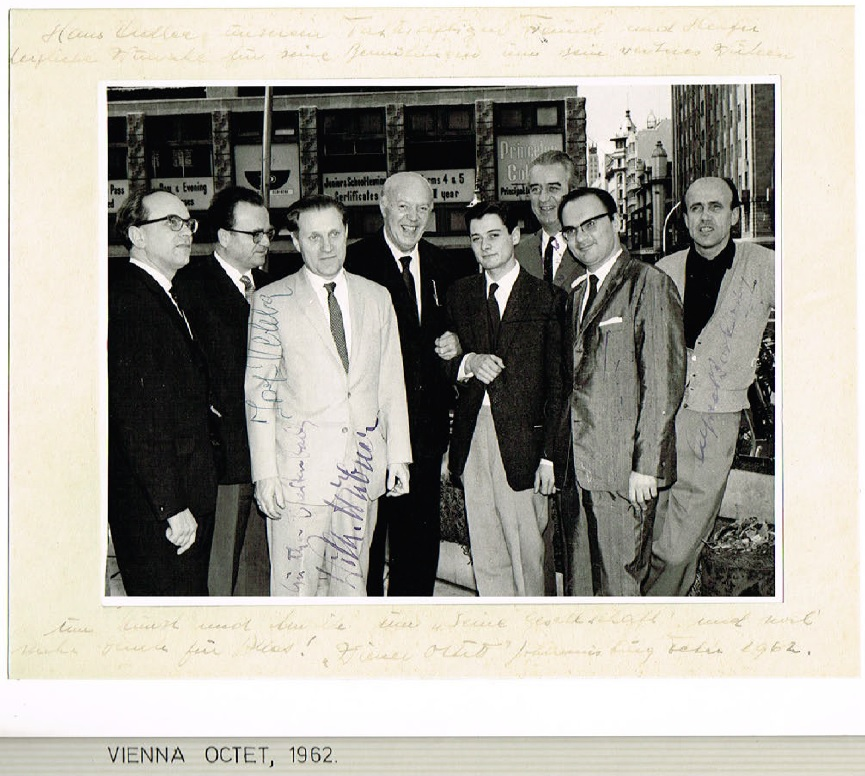
Vienna Octet 1962 on tour of Southern Africa. photo dedicated to tour organiser Hans Adler.

Boskovsky was also a Mozart performer: he recorded all the sonatas for violin and piano, with pianist Lili Kraus, and the complete trios for violin, piano and cello, with Kraus and Nikolaus Hübner for Les Discophiles Français. He played in Brahms' Double Concerto in A minor, Op.102, with Wilhelm Furtwängler conducting the Vienna Philharmonic. Other highlights include prominent violin solos in orchestral works, including Richard Strauss's Ein Heldenleben recorded with Clemens Krauss.

A month after his last New Year's Concert, after having already agreed with Alfred Altenburger to conduct again in 1980, on 30 January 1979 he was hit by a stroke, which caused him a slight paralysis on the right side. In October 1979, the convalescence being too slow, he communicated his decision to give up and the orchestra asked Lorin Maazel, designated director of the Vienna State Opera, to carry on the tradition of these concerts.

He died in Visp, Valais (Switzerland) at the age of 81.

== Style ==
His style appealed to many Johann Strauss I listeners as he directed Strauss' music in the manner of the "Stehgeiger", i.e. directing the orchestra with the violin just as Strauss popularised this form of conducting waltzes, polkas and other dance music alongside rival Josef Lanner in the early 19th century. This tradition was also carried on by Johann Strauss II and Josef Strauss after their father's death. Boskovsky was sympathetic to the Strauss style. Apart from the Strauss family waltzes, Boskovsky recorded a 10-album cycle of the complete Mozart Dances and Marches, leading what Decca Records called the Vienna Mozart Ensemble (assorted members of the Vienna Philharmonic). Many of these recordings were included on the Philips/Polygram Complete Mozart series of CDs issued in the 1990s.

Boskovsky's New Year's Day 1979 concert was recorded live by Decca, the first commercial use of their proprietary PCM digital system. The resulting 2-LP set was well received. Quoting Gramophone magazine: "This is a riotous issue ... the first recording to be manufactured and released in the UK utilizing digital recording ... astoundingly vivid and atmospheric ... the results are phenomenal." The album was most recently released as part of the Decca Legends series, remastered in 96k/24-bit PCM.

== Ensemble recordings ==
The Boskovsky Quartet and Vienna Octet made a number of recordings for Decca Records, among which are the following:

- Dvořák, Quartet no 3 E flat major op 51 (LXT 2601). (EMG Monthly Newsletter review September 1951).
- Schubert, Octet in F major op 166 (LXT 2983). (EMG review December 1958). (Decca CD 466580).
- Schubert, 'Trout' Quintet, with Walter Panhoffer (LXT 2533). (issued by 1950, EMG review Feb 1959). (Pearl CD 0129).
- Schubert, 'Trout' Quintet, with Clifford Curzon (LXT 5433). (EMG review September 1958).
- Beethoven, Septet in E flat major op 20 (78rpm, AX 306–10 (10 sides), Ace of Diamonds SDD 200). (issued by 1950). (Testament CD 1261).
- Brahms, Clarinet Quintet op 115. (LXT 2858; Testament CD 1282).
- Spohr, Nonet op 31 (LXT 2782). (EMG review May 1953). (Testament CD 1261).
- Spohr, Octet op 32 (LXT 5294). (EMG review August 1957). (Decca CD 466580).
- Mendelssohn, Octet in E flat major op 20 (LXT 2870). (EMG review February 1954).
- Kreutzer, Grand Septet in E flat major op 62 (LXT 2628). (EMG review December 1951).
- Poot, Octet (LXT 5294). (EMG review August 1957).
- Mozart, Clarinet Quintet in A major K 581 (LXT 5032). (EMG review June 1955). (Testament CD 1282).
- Mozart, Quintet in E flat major K 452 (LXT 5293). (EMG review April 1957).
- Mozart, Trio in E flat major K 498, with Walter Panhoffer (LXT 5293). (EMG review April 1957).
- Mozart, Divertimento in F major K 247 (lx 3105 (78 rpm)). (issued by 1953).
- Mozart, Divertimento in B flat major K 287 (LXT 5112). (EMG review September 1956).
- Mozart, Divertimento in D major K 334 (with Otto Nitsch, horn), (LXT 2542). (issued by 1950, EMG review Feb 1951). (Pearl CD 0129).

Boskovsky plays the solo violin line in the Clemens Krauss recording of Richard Strauss's Ein Heldenleben (Decca LP ACL 241).
