= Josephine Amann-Weinlich =

Austrian pianist, composer and conductor

Josephine Amann-Weinlich (also Josephine Weinlich, also spelled Josefine; 2 August 1848 – 9 January 1887) was an Austrian pianist, violinist, conductor and composer. She founded and conducted Europe's first women orchestra.

== Life ==
Josephine Weinlich was born in 1848 in Dechtice (now in Slovakia). She was a daughter of Franz Weinlich and his wife Josepha; he settled in Vienna as a ribbon manufacturer. She received music lessons from her father, playing violin and piano. Her father had a folk-singing society, and from 1865 she accompanied singers on the piano at restaurants in Vienna.

=== New Viennese Ladies' Orchestra ===
In 1868 in Vienna she formed a quartet, in which she played piano and her sister Elise played cello. It first gave private performances; with two more musicians, the ensemble performed in August 1868, in the Dreher'sche Bierhalle (beer hall) in Ungargasse, Vienna, as Das neue Wiener Damen-Orchester (The New Viennese Ladies' Orchestra). It was led by Weinlich from the piano. Music played included concert overtures, music by the Strauss family, and her own compositions. The ensemble, also called Josefine Weinlich's Damenkapelle (Josefine Weinlich's Ladies' Band), gave further performances in Vienna. The orchestra grew in size, and in 1869 gave concerts in other European cities. In 1871 they toured the United States; in 1872 they played in Saint Petersburg.

Weinlich married in 1870 Ebo Fortunatus (Ritter) von Amann (1846–1899). He was a concert agent, and after their marriage he managed the orchestra.

=== First European Ladies' Orchestra ===
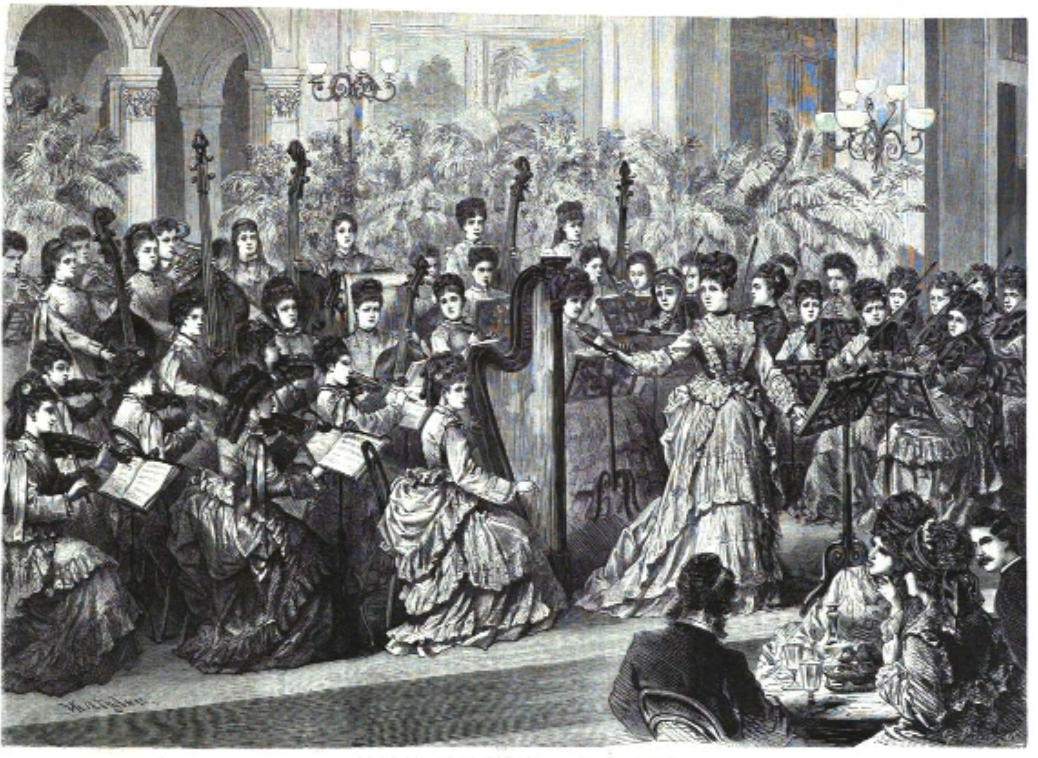
First European Ladies' Orchestra, Vienna; woodcut by Vinzenz Katzler (1874)

In May 1873, Das Erste Europäische Damenorchester (The First European Ladies' Orchestra), conducted by Amann-Weinlich, gave its first concert at the Musikverein in Vienna. There were forty players: 33 women, with 7 boys playing brass instruments. In the summer they gave evening concerts at the 1873 Vienna World's Fair. In the following months the orchestra visited Dresden, Leipzig, Berlin and Paris, and later played in Italy and England. A reviewer wrote in The Musical Standard (1873, p. 376): "Mme. Amann Weinlich represents the perfect type of the grand priestess of the musical world. Her glance is comprehensive, her arm vigorous...". In 1876 they played in Scandinavia, the Netherlands and Germany. The orchestra later disbanded.

=== Cäcilien Quartet, and Lisbon ===
In 1878 she founded, with other members of the orchestra including her sister, the Cäcilien Quartet, a piano quartet in which she played piano; they performed in Sweden, Denmark, Germany and Switzerland; music played included works by Robert Schumann and Felix Mendelssohn, and her own compositions.

From 1879 Amann-Weinlich lived in Lisbon with her husband, children and sister. Ebo Amann arranged for her to conduct the city orchestra in a series of concerts at the Teatro da Trindade, and she was conductor for one season at the Teatro Nacional de São Carlos. She was editor of the Gazeta Musical, financed by her husband, which published some of her compositions. She remained in Lisbon with her family as a piano teacher; she died there of tuberculosis on 9 January 1887.

== Compositions ==
Amann-Weinlich was described in Musikalisches Wochenblatt (1871, p. 718) as "a composer of pleasing, often quite piquant works of light genres, such as waltzes, polkas, etc." Some of her compositions were published in Vienna.
