= Morgenblätter =

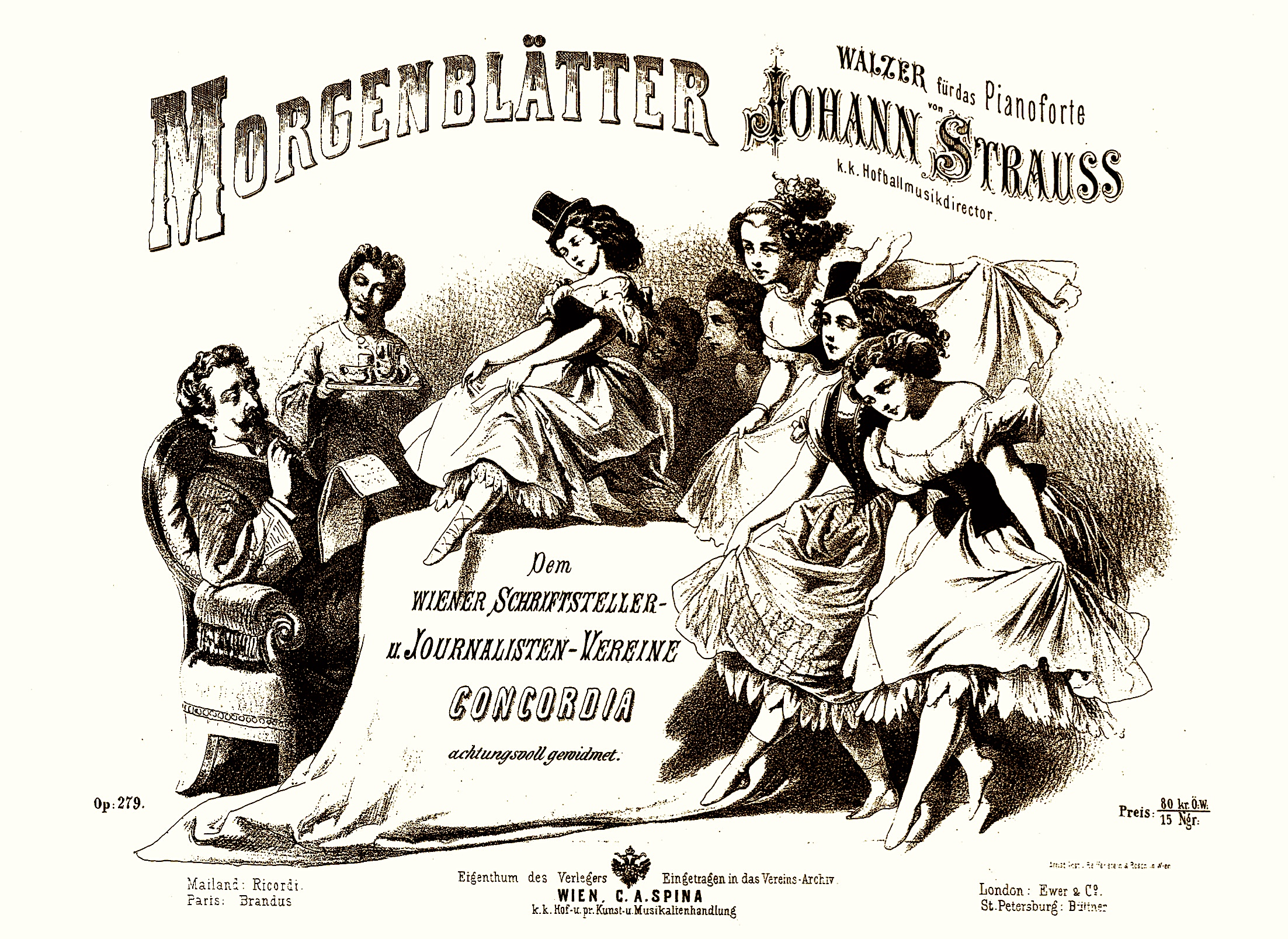
Title page of first (piano) edition, 1864, arranged by the composer himself

Morgenblätter (Morning Papers), Op. 279, is a Viennese waltz composed by Johann Strauss II in 1863 and first performed on 12 January 1864 at the Sofiensaal in Vienna.

== Genesis ==
The work's genesis was attributed to the composition of a waltz by Jacques Offenbach later titled "Abendblätter" when Offenbach dedicated his work to the influential Vienna Authors' and Journalists' Association (Presseclub Concordia). The association had earlier intended the "Abendblätter" waltz (untitled by Offenbach when first dedicated) to be played at their Concordia Ball on 12 January 1864.

Strauss and his orchestra were engaged to provide music for the festivity and he was also obliged to dedicate a new composition of his own. Since he was clearly aware of Offenbach's dedication, he similarly left it to the association to decide the title of his own work. The committee, in a mood for a musical joust, titled Offenbach's work as "Abendblätter" (Evening Papers) and Strauss' work as "Morgenblätter" (Morning Papers). Friendly rivalry was top of their intentions though as Strauss dutifully premiered Offenbach's work as well as his own because the latter was not present on the day in question. Despite many later claims that Strauss' work was initially ignored, first night press reviews do not proclaim in favor of either work although posterity seemed to pronounce in favor of Strauss' uplifting work with the "Abendblätter" waltz being equally impressive.

== Music ==
The work consists of a brief introduction in 2/4 followed by a sequence of waltz themes, the first of which is reprised.

=== Main theme ===
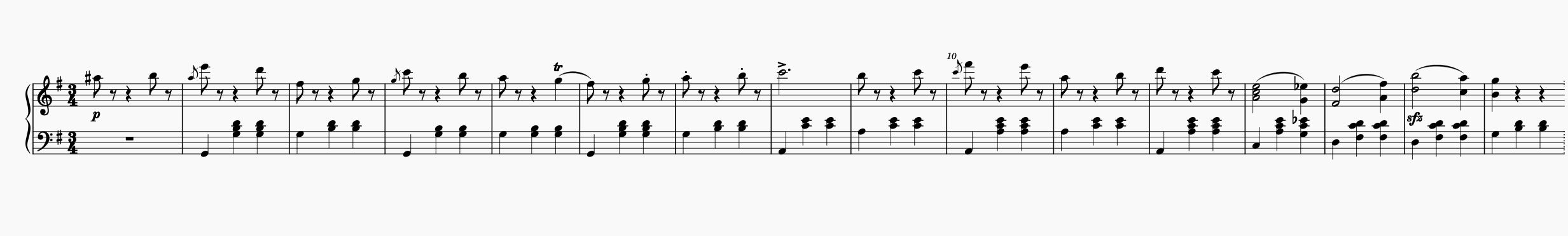
Morgenblätter (main theme)

(play)

=== Description ===
"Morgenblätter" is another of Strauss' more inspired waltzes, during the time where the development of the waltz has been rapid, with varying moods immortalised amongst the 5 two-part sections. The quiet introduction in the key of D major begins the work, with repeated chords in the bass-line. A sharp series of loud chords interrupts the playful mood and a long clarinet passage ushers in the first waltz theme in G major. Waltz 1B (in D major) carries on the exuberant mood before a repeat of waltz 1A quickly proceeds to the tranquility of waltz 2A in C major. Waltz 3A and 3B (F major) is more robust and quicker than the previous sections whereas waltz 4A in B♭ major is quiet and brooding. Waltz 4B erupts in joy for a brief section and proceeding to repeat waltz 4A. Waltz 5A is the climax of the work, in E♭ major and is punctuated with the brass instruments, particularly the trombones. A more peaceful-sounding waltz 5B is played but the brash 5A makes another appearance.

A tense coda would be quickly replaced with a reprise of waltz 2A. A furious passage of chords brought in waltz 1A again before sweeping into a joyous conclusion complete with a snare drumroll and orchestral flourish.

Thomas Hardy's poem "A Seaside Town in 1869" (in Moments of Vision, 1917) suggests that the waltz was popular in England in the late 1860s.

== Recordings ==
- Michael Lanner with his orchestra. Recorded in Berlin on March 20, 1953. It was released by Electrola as catalog number EG 7897.

== In popular culture ==
In The Simpsons season 34 episode "Bartless", the waltz is played while Lisa dances in a dream sequence.
