= Johann Strauss III =

Austrian composer (1866-1939)

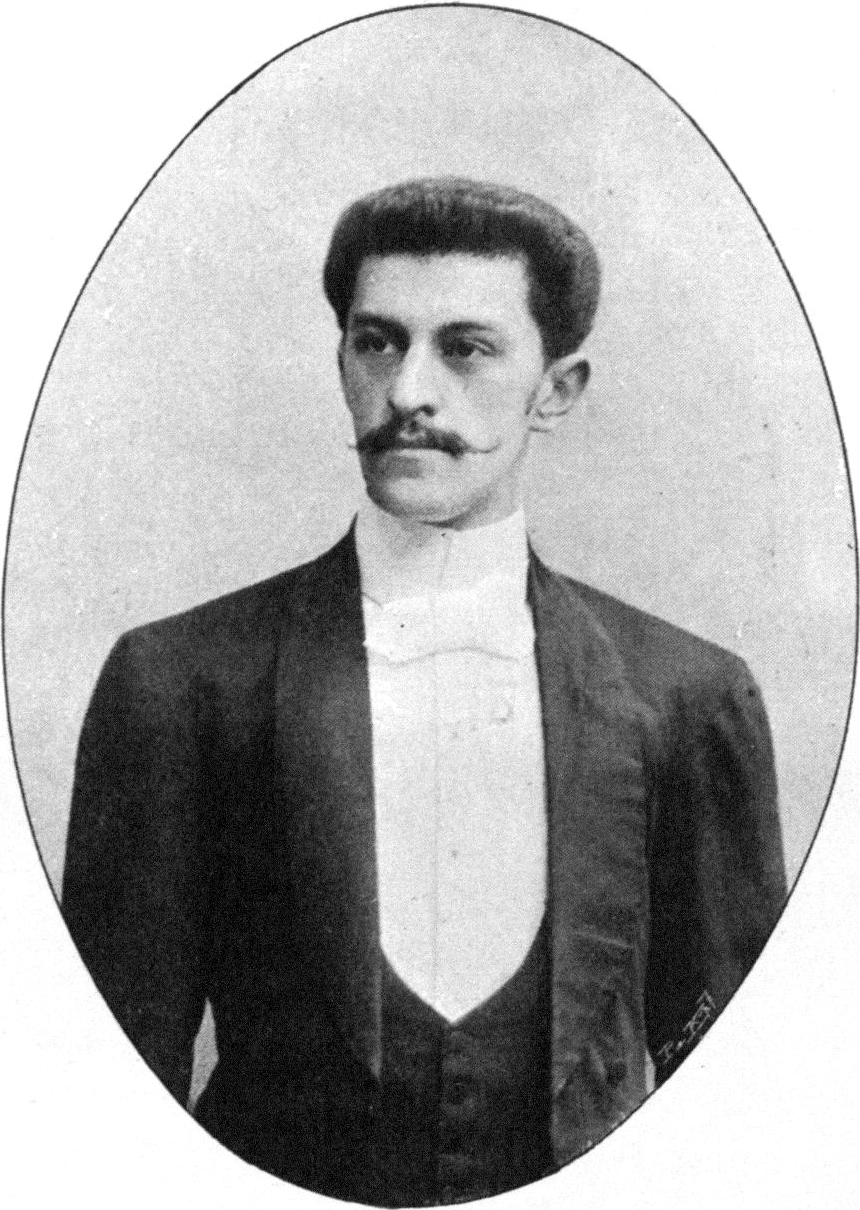
Strauss III in 1900

Johann Maria Eduard Strauss III (/straʊs/; German: Johann Strauß III [ˈjoːhan ˈʃtʁaʊs]; 16 February 1866 – 9 January 1939) was an Austrian composer whose father was Eduard Strauss, whose uncles were Johann Strauss II and Josef Strauss, and whose grandfather was Johann Strauss I. Born in Vienna, he was unofficially entrusted with the task of upholding his family's tradition after the dissolution of the Strauss Orchestra by his father in 1901. His talents were not fully realized during his lifetime as musical tastes had changed in the Silver Age with more popular composers such as Franz Lehár and Oscar Straus dominating the Viennese musical scene with their operettas, although his uncle, Johann Strauss II, supervised his development as a musician, a fact disputed by Eduard Strauss.

Arrival of Johan Strauss III and his orchestra in The Hague in 1929

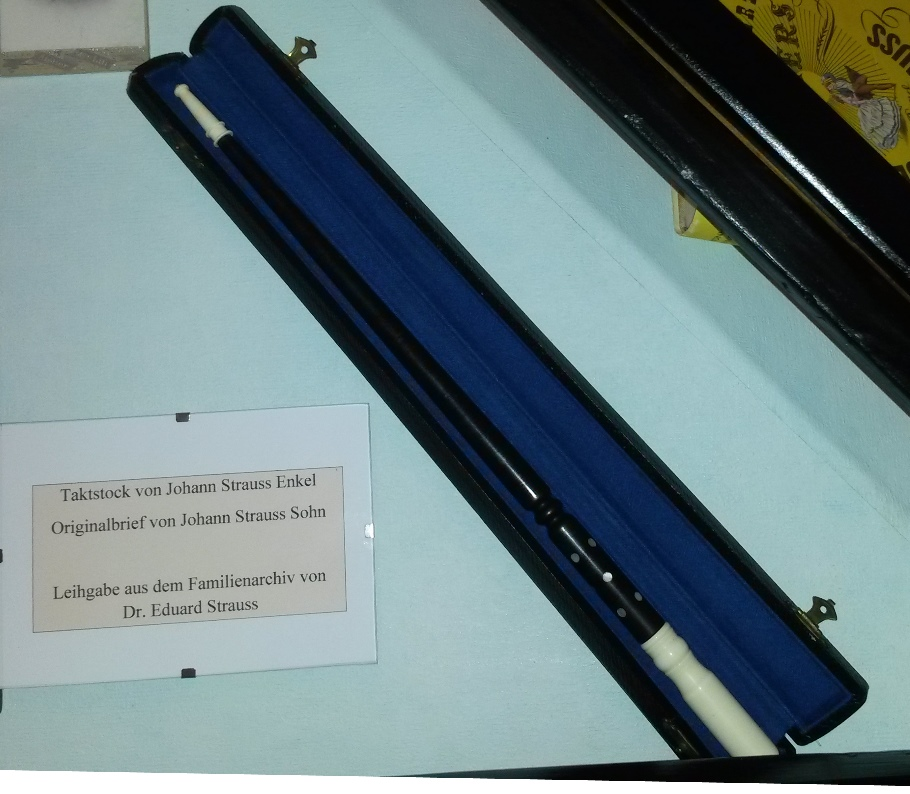
Baton of Johann Strauss III in the Strauss Museum Vienna

Despite Strauss’ keen interest in composing, he was better remembered as a conductor. His only stage work, the three-act operetta Katze und Maus, composed in 1898, premiered in Vienna on 23 December 1898, at the Theater an der Wien. Its public reaction bordered on utter dislike, and music critics called for the distraught composer to reassess himself and to appear under a pseudonym, in order not to tarnish the name of his famous relatives. He salvaged the music score and produced independent pieces of which the waltzes Sylvanien, Op. 1 and Leonie, Op. 2 survived obscurity.

Strauss also conducted from the violin in the style of the Vorgeiger and of his family. In 1903, he elevated the Strauss family to a new age of development when the Deutsche Grammophon AG of Germany recorded his conducting of the Johann Strauss Orchestra on eight single-sided records of works by his family. Principally, he was the first conductor in the Strauss family to actively conduct works to be recorded by prominent recording companies. His later works, such as Dem Muthigen gehört die Welt (The World Belongs to the Brave), Op. 25, Unter den Linden (Under the Linden Trees), Op. 30, and Krönungs-Walzer (Coronation Waltz), Op. 40 (the latter celebrating the coronation of King Edward VII of the United Kingdom), were also considerably more popular than his earlier efforts.

He died in Berlin at the age of 72.

== Works ==
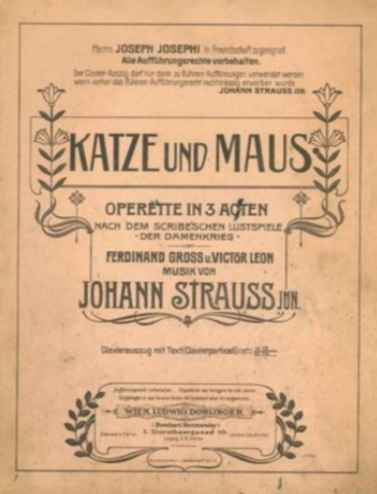
Operetta Katze und Maus.

- Sylvanien-Walzer, Op. 1
- Leonie-Walzer, Op. 2
- Comme il faut, Op. 3
- Rococo-Gavotte, Op. 4
- Empire, Polka-Mazur, Op. 5
- Schlau-Schlau Polka schnell, Op. 6
- Dragoner-Marsch, Op. 7
- Katze und Maus Quadrille, Op. 8
- Musette, Op. 9

From, Op. 10 to 23 is undiscovered.

- Gruss aus Wien Walzer, Op. 24
- Dem Muthigen gehört die Welt Walzer, Op. 25
- Budapester-Polka, Op. 26
- Frisch durch's Leben Galop, Op. 27
- Rosige Laune Mazurka, Op. 28
- Mit vereinten Kräften Marsch, Op. 29
- Unter den Linden – Walzer, Op. 30
- Die Schlittschuhläuferin Walzer, Op. 31
- Wiener Weisen Walzer, Op. 32
- Mariana-Valse, Op. 33
- Im-Galopp, Op. 34
- Ludmilla-Mazurka, Op. 35
- In der Blütezeit Walzer, Op. 36
- Mit freudigen Herzen Polka, Op. 37
- Dichterliebe-Walzer, Op. 38
- Wilhelminen-Walzer, Op. 39
- Krönungs-Walzer, Op. 40
