= Josef Strauss =

Austrian composer

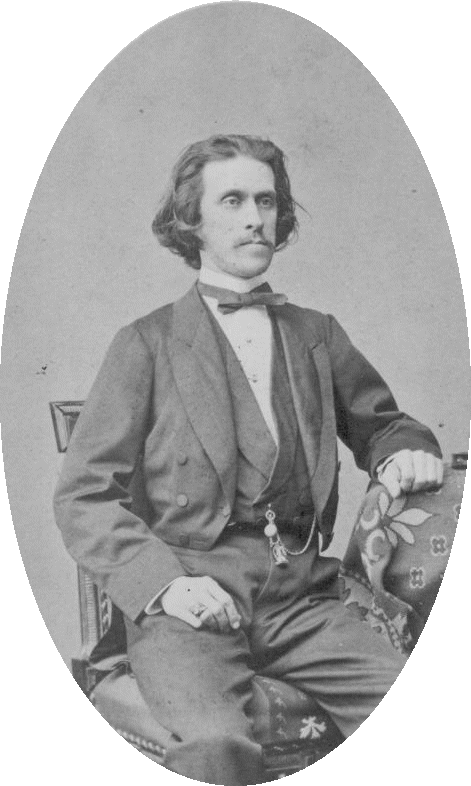
- Born: Josef Luckhardt Strauss; 20 August 1827; Mariahilf
- Died: 22 July 1870 (aged 42); Vienna
- Burial place: Vienna Central Cemetery
- Spouse: Caroline Pruckmayer
- Children: 1
- Relatives: Julius Epstein (adoptive great-nephew); Josef Strauss III (great-nephew); Josef Strauss II (nephew)

Josef Luckhardt Strauss I (20 August 1827 – 22 July 1870) was an Austrian composer.

== Early life ==
He was born in Mariahilf (now Vienna), the son of Johann Strauss I and Maria Anna Streim, and brother of Johann Strauss II and Eduard Strauss. His father wanted him to choose a career in the Austrian Habsburg military. He studied music with Franz Dolleschal and learned to play the violin with Franz Anton Ries.

He received training as an engineer, and worked for the city of Vienna as an engineer and designer. He designed a horse-drawn revolving brush street-sweeping vehicle and published two textbooks on mathematical subjects. Strauss had talents as an artist, painter, poet, dramatist, singer, composer and inventor.

== Family orchestra ==
He joined the family orchestra, along with his brothers, Johann Strauss II and Eduard Strauss in the 1850s. His first published work was called "Die Ersten und Letzten" (The First and the Last). When Johann became seriously ill in 1853 Josef led the orchestra for a while. The waltz-loving Viennese were appreciative of his early compositions so he decided to continue in the family tradition of composing dance music. He was known as 'Pepi' by his family and close friends, and Johann once said of him: "Pepi is the more gifted of us two; I am merely the more popular..."

== Family life ==
Josef Strauss married Caroline Pruckmayer at the church of St. Johann Nepomuk in Vienna on 8 June 1857 and had one daughter, Karolina Anna, who was born on 27 March 1858.

== Music ==
Josef Strauss wrote 283 works with opus numbers. He wrote many waltzes, including: Sphären-Klänge (Music of the Spheres), Delirien (Deliriums), Transaktionen (Transactions), Mein Lebenslauf ist Lieb' und Lust (My Character is Love and Joy), and Dorfschwalben aus Österreich (Village Swallows from Austria), polkas, most famously the Pizzicato Polka with his brother Johann, quadrilles, and other dance music, and also some marches. The waltz The Mysterious Powers of Magnetism (Dynamiden) with the use of minor keys showed a quality that distinguished his waltzes from those of his more popular elder brother. The polka-mazurka shows influence by Strauss, where he wrote many examples like Die Emancipierte and Die Libelle.

== Death ==
Josef Strauss was sick most of his later life. He was prone to fainting spells and intense headaches. During a tour in 1870, he fell unconscious from the conductor's podium in Warsaw while conducting his 'Musical Potpourri', striking his head. His wife brought him back home to Vienna, to the Hirschenhaus, where he died on 22 July of that year. A final diagnosis cited only decomposed blood. There were rumors that he had been beaten by drunken Russian soldiers after allegedly refusing to perform for them one night. A specific cause of death was not determined, since his widow forbade any autopsy. Originally buried in the St. Marx Cemetery, Strauss was later exhumed and reburied in the Vienna Central Cemetery, alongside his mother Anna.

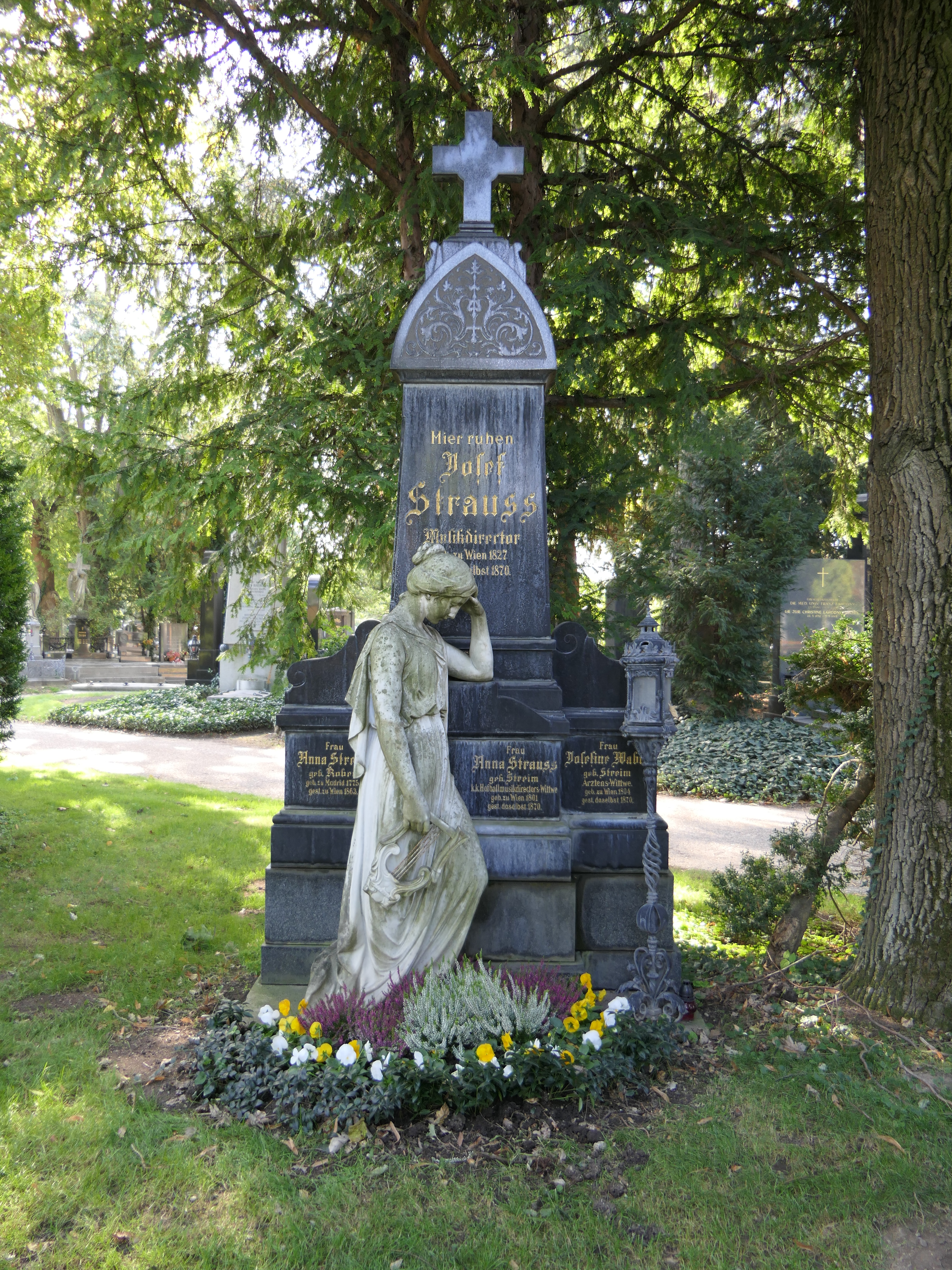
Grave of Josef Strauss at Vienna Central Cemetery

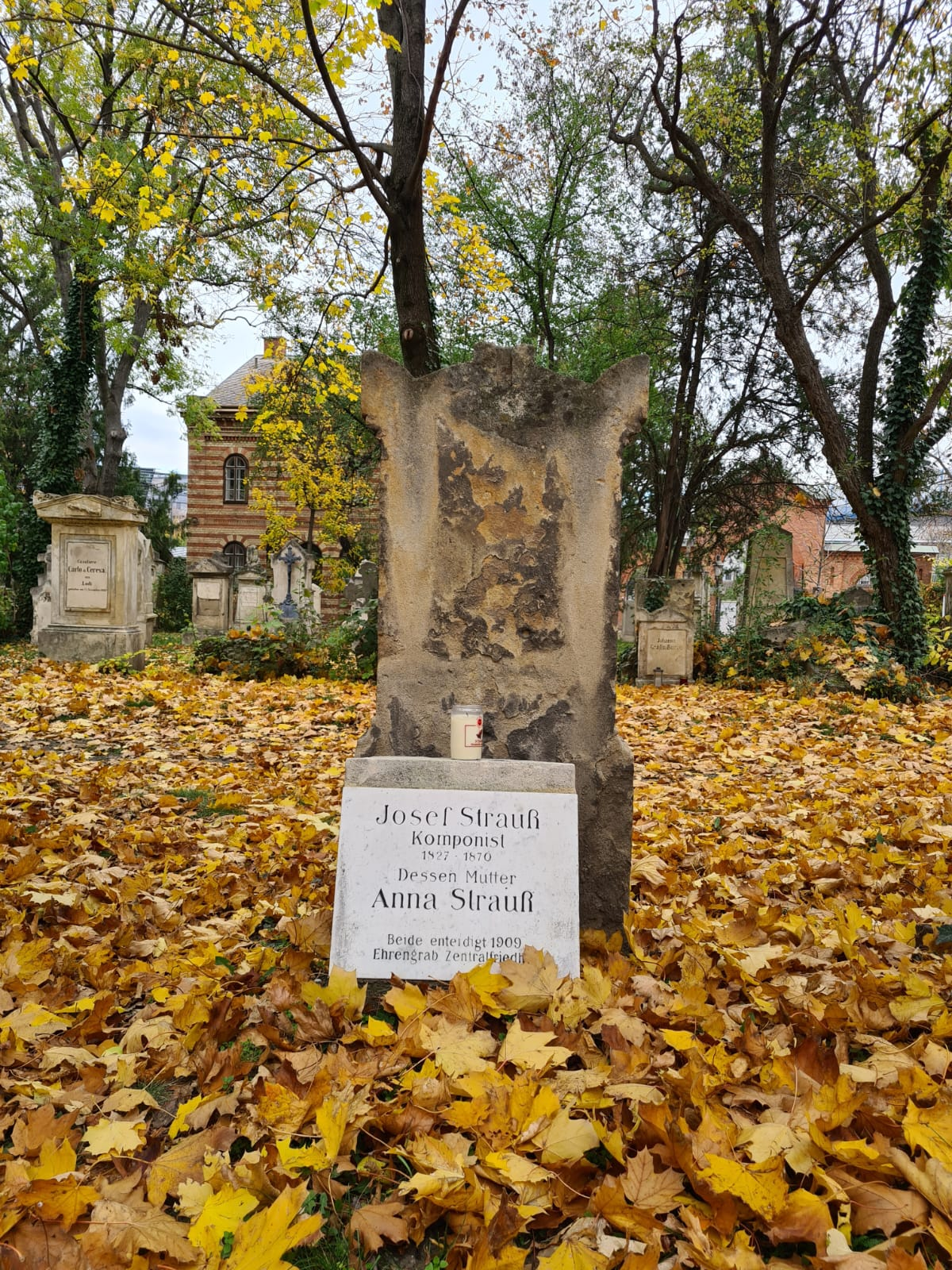
Monument to Josef and Anna Strauss at St. Marx Cemetery, Vienna

== Works ==
The works of Josef Strauss include:

- Die Ersten und Letzten ('The First and the Last') waltz op. 1 (1853)
- Die Ersten nach den Letzten ('The First after the Last') waltz op. 12 (1854)
- Die Guten, Alten Zeiten ('The Good Old Times') waltz op. 26 (1856)
- Mai-Rosen ('May-Rose') waltz op. 34 (1857)
- Liechtenstein-Marsch op. 36 (1857)
- Perlen der Liebe ('Pearls of Love') concert-waltz op. 39 (1857)
- Wallonen-Marsch ('Walloon March') op. 41 (1857)
- Moulinet-Polka ('Little Mill Pond') polka francaise op. 57 (1858)
- Laxenburger-Polka, Op. 60 (1858)
- Sympathie ('Sympathy') polka-mazurka op. 73 (1859)
- Lustschwärmer ('Joy Seeker') waltz op. 91 (1860)
- Schabernack ('Shenanigans'), fast polka op. 98
- Phönix-Marsch ('Phoenix March') op. 105
- Wiener Bonmots ('Viennese Bon-mots') waltz op. 108 (1861)
- Winterlust ('Winter Joy') polka op. 121 (1862)
- Brennende Liebe polka-mazurka op. 129 (1862)
- Auf Ferienreisen! ('On a Holiday!') polka op. 133 (1863)
- Die Schwätzerin ('The Gossip') polka-mazurka op. 144 (1863)
- Wiener Couplets ('Viennese Couplets') waltz op. 150 (1863)
- Dorfschwalben aus Österreich ('Village Swallows from Austria') waltz op. 164 (1864)
- Frauenherz ('A Woman's Heart') polka-mazurka op. 166 (1864)
- Sport-Polka op. 170 (1864)
- Dynamiden (Geheime Anziehungskräfte) ('Mysterious Powers of Magnetism') waltz op. 173 (1865)
- Stiefmütterchen ('Pansies') polka-mazurka op. 183 (1865)
- Transaktionen ('Transactions') waltz op. 184 (1865)
- Carrière, fast polka, op. 200
- Die Marketenderin ('The Camp Follower') polka op. 202 (1866)
- Die Libelle ('The Dragonfly') polka-mazurka op. 204 (1866)
- Delirien ('Deliriums') waltz op. 212 (1867)
- Herbstrosen ('Autumn Rose') waltz op. 232 (1867)
- Sphärenklänge ('Music of the Spheres') waltz op. 235 (1868)
- Eingesendet ('Letters to the Editor') polka op. 240 (1868)
- Plappermäulchen ('Chatterboxes') polka op. 245 (1868)
- Aquarellen (waltz) ('Watercolours') waltz op. 258 (1869)
- Eislauf ('Ice-Skating') polka op. 261 (1869)
- Neckerei ('Teasing') polka mazur op. 262
- Mein Lebenslauf ist Lieb und Lust ('My Character is Love and Joy') waltz op. 263 (1869)
- Die Tanzende Muse ('The Dancing Muse') polka-mazurka op. 266 (1869)
- Feuerfest! ('Fireproof!') polka française op. 269 (1869).
- Aus der Ferne Polka Mazur op. 270 (1869)
- Ohne Sorgen! ('Without a Care!') polka op. 271 (1869)
- Nilfluthen ('Nile's Waters') waltz op. 275 (1870)
- Frauenwürde waltz op. 277 (1870)
- Jokey-Polka ('Jockey') op. 278 (1870)
- Hesperusbahnen ('Hesperus’ Paths') waltz op. 279 (1870)
- Die Emancipierte ('The Emancipated Woman') polka-mazurka op. 282 (1870)

== See also ==
- List of Austrians in music
- The Strauss Family – TV Drama
- Strauss Museum Vienna
