= Senever =

Turkmen folktale

Senever is a Turkmen folktale. It is classified in the international Aarne-Thompson-Uther Index as ATU 314, "Goldener". It deals with a friendship between a prince and a talking horse; both are later forced to flee for their lives due to the boy's stepmother, and reach another kingdom, where the boy adopts another identity.

Although it differs from variants wherein a hero acquires golden hair, its starting sequence (persecution by the hero's stepmother) is considered by scholarship as an alternate opening to the same tale type.

== Summary ==
In this tale, a sultan has two co-wives and no children. He goes to a doctor, who gives him an apple for him to share with his wives. He brings the apple home and places it on a table, while he goes to summon the second wife. The elder wife sees the apple, takes a knife to cut it and eats it whole. The sultan and the other wife returns and find no fruit, and the first wife tries to avoid trouble by saying she ate the apple which was there. The sultan goes back to talk to the doctor, who advises him to pour water over the knife and give the liquid to his other wife. It happens thus, and both women are pregnant. They each give birth to a son, an event that is celebrated by the monarch with a seven-day celebration. One day, the sultan gives a foal to his son with the younger wife. The prince and the foal grow up and become good friends. The elder co-wife begins to despise her stepson's happiness in his playtime with the horse and decides to get rid of them: she feigns illness and tells the sultan a doctor prescribed the meat of a foal. Planning to eliminate the horse first, she moans and whines so much, the sultan relents and agrees to sacrifice his son's foal. The foal, which was intelligent and could talk, begins to cry and tells the prince they plan to kill it on a certain day, so it will neigh three times to alert the prince; if his teacher forbids him from leaving school, he is to hit him with a mallet and rush to help the foal.

On the designated day, while the prince is at school, he hears the foal neigh for him, so he tries to excuse himself, but his teacher forbids him. The second time, the teacher holds him back. Lastly, the prince hears the third neigh, takes a mallet and hits the teacher's head with it, and goes back home to help his foal friend. He sees that the foal is nearly being killed, when he asks the sultan to ride the horse one last time before it is killed. The sultan indulges his son, and the prince mounts the horse. The foal realizes that they cannot live in that realm any longer, and bids the prince gather some clothes and ride on the horse. The horse then takes the prince away through the sky and both land in another country. The foal tells the prince to disguise himself as a laborer and find some work nearby, then bids him burn the sword he got from the horse to summon it.

The boy leaves his clothes with the foal and goes to the nearby city to find work. He is hired as a helper in the vineyard of a rich man. One day, he goes to cut wood before going to the vineyard, when he finds three girls, the princesses, on the way. The girls mock him, and he harasses them in return. For this, the girls beat him. A shoemaker intervenes on his behalf and says that he only wanted a comb. The elder two refuse the boy, but the youngest gives him a comb. He takes the comb, hides in a corner and summons his horse, then dons his royal clothes. The youngest girl goes to retrieve her comb, when she sees the prince and faints. The prince dismisses the horse, returns to his lowly disguise and returns the comb, and helps her back to consciousness.

The princess and the servant return to the others, who are talking to the vineyard owner about how to convince their father to marry them off. The vineyard owner suggests the princesses send three lemons of varying ripeness and quality to their father to represent their marriageability, and their father will understand that the elder's is nearly rotten, the middle one's is ripe, and the youngest's is starting to ripen, which means that the elder's time to marry is already passing, the middle one is almost on time, and the youngest's is starting to come. The princesses do as instructed and the sultan correctly interprets their intention, then sends for young suitors to come and pass before the palace. The suitors gather and the princesses throw an apple to their suitors of choice: the elder to the white minister's son and the middle one to the black minister's son, but the cadette withholds hers. The sultan asks if there is any other available suitor in the city, and they mention the gardener's adopted son. The sultan orders the soldiers to bring in the gardener's son, and the princess throws the apple to him. The people say she made a mistake and walk the boy past her again, and again she throws her apple to him, and whenever they walk him past her. The sultan accepts this outcome and lets his elder daughters live with him in the palace, but banishes his cadette, named Gülcemal, to live with the gardener's assistant in the stables.

Gülcemal is beautiful and intelligent. One day, the prince tells her he will herd all the animals of the region to a place, for her to see what will happen. The prince does as he planned, and locks the animals in a cave. Meanwhile, the prince's brothers-in-law want to invite the sultan and go hunting. They have no luck finding any game and find the prince, whom they do not recognize, in front of the cave and ask them for some game. The prince agrees to a deal: some deer in exchange for branding a seal on their backs. The duo make a deal, believing that no one will ever know of their agreement. The prince moves the animals to a pen near the stables. The princesses cook the meal for their father, and Gülcemal prepares a dish that the sultan enjoys and asks for more. For the second dish, Gülcemal places some horse manure in the meal which her father notices. Gülcemal explains that the manure is due to her and her husband living in the stables. The sultan goes to visit his youngest daughter and finds the many animals in the pen, then asks the gardener's assistant about it. The prince says that the animals are his, and he is in search of his two slaves that have his seal on their backs. The sultan investigates every person in the kingdom, even his two other sons-in-law. For this, the sultan recognizes his cadette's intelligence, regrets expelling her from the palace and builds a palace of gold and silver for her.

Months and years later, the prince tells Gülcemal he will seek fairy Dilaram, but makes a detour back home. He returns home and notices that his half-brother, born of his stepmother who once tried to kill him, has married a beautiful maiden. To avoid confusion, he places a sword between themselves in bed. The next morning, Senever (the prince's name) departs and meets a dev with seven sons. The dev welcomes Senever, who tells him about his quest for the fairy Dilaram, and dev takes the prince to the fairy's lair. Dilaram tells the boy that, in order to have her, Senever is to find grapes in the middle of winter, carry a bowl of water up a tree without spilling a drop, and separate forty camel loads of lice mixed with hair in three days, lift a heavy stone and carry it up and down a tree forty times, and finally defeat her in chess.

The dev and his family help Senever in fulfilling the tasks, with the king of the ants and its army separaing the lice from the hair, while Senever busies himself with playing chess with fairy Dilaram. Senever plays against the fairy and appears to be beating her, but she begins to flirt with him for three matches and defeats the prince. She announces that the prince is now her prisoner along with many others that came before. Suddenly, a flock of cranes fly down next to him, and Senever writes a letter that a crane carries to his half-brother. The other prince receives the letter and questions his mother, Senever's stepmother who once tried to kill him, about the brother he never knew he had. The co-queen spins a story that he ran away years ago, and the half-brother decides to rescue Senever.

Senever's half-brother meets the same dev and his family that helped Senever, and they form an alliance to defeat Dilaram and rescue Senever, with the devs defeating her challenges. Senever's half-brother meets Dilaram, hears her terms and conditions, then returns to the dev, asking him to bring a mouse and a cat from the mouse field. The second prince and Dilaram play chess, but, on almost losing, he releases a mouse in the room. The cat jumps after the mouse, which distracts Dilaram and she loses three matches. The dev-helpers them shout for her to release Senever, which she does. The devs find Senever in an emaciated state and bring him some rosewater to restore him. The devs take hold of Dilaram's possessions, and Senever, his half-brother, his sister-in-law and Dilaram all return to Senever's father's palace. They find that their father, the sultan, has gone blind, so they pour some Zamzam water to restore his sight. Senever's half-brother learns that his mother tried to kill Senever and issues an ultimatum: either they hang his mother, or he leaves with Senever. Their father accepts his other son's departure, and the quartet leaves for Gülcemal's land.

== Analysis ==
=== Tale type ===
The tale is classified in the Aarne-Thompson-Uther Index as type ATU 314, "The Goldener": a youth with golden hair works as the king's gardener. The type may also open with the prince for some reason being the servant of an evil being, where he gains the same gifts, and the tale proceeds as in this variant.

==== Introductory episodes ====
Scholarship notes three different opening episodes to the tale type: (1) the hero becomes a magician's servant and is forbidden to open a certain door, but he does and dips his hair in a pool of gold; (2) the hero is persecuted by his stepmother, but his loyal horse warns him and later they both flee; (3) the hero is given to the magician as payment for the magician's help with his parents' infertility problem. Folklorist Christine Goldberg, in Enzyklopädie des Märchens, related the second opening to former tale type AaTh 532, "The Helpful Horse (I Don't Know)", wherein the hero is persecuted by his stepmother and flees from home with his horse. (Note: According to Stith Thompson's 1961 revision of the index, in type 532 the hero's helpful horse advises him to answer every question with the sentence "I don't know".)

American folklorist Barre Toelken recognized the spread of the tale type across Northern, Eastern and Southern Europe, but identified three subtypes: one that appears in Europe (Subtype 1), wherein the protagonist becomes the servant to a magical person, finds the talking horse and discovers his benefactor's true evil nature, and acquires a golden colour on some part of his body; a second narrative (Subtype 3), found in Greece, Turkey, Caucasus, Uzbekistan and Northern India, where the protagonist is born through the use of a magical fruit; and a third one (Subtype 2). According to Toelken, this Subtype 2 is "the oldest", being found "in Southern Siberia, Iran, the Arabian countries, Mediterranean, Hungary and Poland". In this subtype, the hero (who may be a prince) and the foal are born at the same time and become friends, but their lives are at stake when the hero's mother asks for the horse's vital organ (or tries to kill the boy to hide her affair), which motivates their flight from their homeland to another kingdom.

=== Motifs ===
Professor Anna Birgitta Rooth stated that the motif of the stepmother's persecution of the hero appears in tale type 314 in variants from Slavonic, Eastern European and Near Eastern regions. She also connected this motif to part of the Cinderella cycle, in a variation involving a male hero and his cow.

==== The hero and his heroic mount ====
According to Turkish scholarship, in Turkic mythology horses can originate from the sky, from the wind, from a cave in the earth, or from the water.

===== Birth of hero and horse through apple =====
Turkologist Ignác Kúnos noted the existence of helpful magical horses in Turkish folklore: the Kamer Tay (Камӓр Таі) and the Sea-Horse (аіҕыр). The Kamar Tay is born from the same apple a Dervish gives to a childless padishah, when a mare eats the apple peels. The magical horse drinks rosewater and eats almonds. According to Turkish scholarship, in some folktales the hero and his incredible mount are born at the same time, after a holy person (a pir or a hazrat) gives the hero's father an apple, which is also shared by a mare.

===== The hero's Sea-Horse mount =====
Kúnos identified a second type of heroic mount in Turkish folklore: the Sea-Horse (аіҕыр), which lives in water, but can emerge and return to it; it comes at night to the surface to drink water and can be tamed if one places iron soles on its hooves. Sometimes the Sea-Horses are identified as children of a Wind Dev. According to Turkish scholarship, this sea-horse is the result of a mating between a mare and a stallion from the sea. Furthermore, the sea-born horse also appears in the folklore of Turkic peoples, either itself coming from a water body or being the result of a mating between a sea-stallion and a terrestrial mare.

In Central Asia, the image of the winged horse was transferred from the Sun deity in ancient times to the horse Duldyulya, the mount of Hezret Ali. Duldul possesses wings and can fly, like Greek Pegasus. In Central Asian mythology, and among the Turkmen, there are also beliefs in water horses ("сув ат"), which live in the sea. In the same vein, in Turkmen fairy tales, horses originate from the water and are called tulpars, with the ability to fly.

==== The suitor selection test ====
In Iranian tales about the sea-horse, the princess throws an apple to her suitor - a motif indexed as motif H316, "Suitor test: apple thrown indicates princess' choice (often golden apple)". According to mythologist Yuri Berezkin and other Russian researchers, the motif is "popular" in Iran, and is also attested "in Central Europe, the Balkans, the Caucasus, the Near East, and Central Asia". In the same vein, professor Mahomed-Nuri Osmanovich Osmanov noted that the motif of the princess throwing an item to choose her husband is "widespread" ("распространение", in the original) in tales from the Iranian peoples.

According to Turkologist Karl Reichl, types ATU 314 and ATU 502 contain this motif: the princess chooses her own husband (of lowly appearance) in a gathering of potential suitors, by giving him an object (e.g., an apple). However, he also remarks that the motif is "spread in folk literature" and may appear in other tale types.

Germanist Günter Dammann, in Enzyklopädie des Märchens, argued that Subtype 2 (see above) represented the oldest form of the Goldener narrative, since the golden apple motif in the suitor selection roughly appears in the geographic distribution of the same subtype.

==== Branding the brothers-in-law ====
According to German scholars Günther Damman and Kurt Ranke, another motif that appears in tale type ATU 314 is the hero branding his brothers-in-law during their hunt. Likewise, Ranke stated that the hero's branding represented a mark of his ownership over his brothers-in-law.

Ranke located the motif in the Orient and in the Mediterranean. In the same vein, Hungarian professor Ákos Dömötör, in the notes to tale type ATU 314 in the Hungarian National Catalogue of Folktales (MNK), remarked that the motif was a "reflection of the Eastern legal custom", which also appears in the Turkic epic Alpamysh.

== Variants ==
According to Germanist Gunter Dammann, tale type 314 with the opening of hero and horse fleeing home extends from Western Himalaya and South Siberia, to Iran and the Arab-speaking countries in the Eastern Mediterranean. In addition, scholar Hasan El-Shamy stated that type 314 is "widely spread throughout north Africa", among Arabs and Berbers; in sub-Saharan Africa, as well as in Arabia and South Arabia.

=== The Padishah's Son ===
In a Turkmen tale titled Patıșanıň oglı or Patyşanyň ogly, translated to Turkish with the title Padișahın Oğlu ("The Padishah's Son"), a sultan has two wives and a son by each wife, the one by the elder one called Kerim. When prince Kerim is nine-years-old, his mother dies, he sends Kerim to herd the horses for the time being. After a while, the sultan sends his son to be educated in the village and leave the horses to their shepherds, but allows his son to choose a foal from the herd. Kerim chooses a weak foal and brings it home, then goes to be taught by the mullah. One day, he goes to meet the foal after school, as he always does, caresses the foal's face and finds it crying. The foal reveals that his stepmother wants to kill the boy and poisoned the plate of "Çapadı" (a type of breadroll fried in oil), so he should avoid it. At home, Kerim asks for normal bread, instead of the Çapadı. The following day, he goes back from school and goes to meet his foal friend, finding him in tears again: this time, the stepmother dug up a hole and filled it with four spears, then covered it with felt for him to sit on. At home, Kerim asks his stepmother for some bread in the eaves, but his younger half-brother runs home from his playtime and falls into the pit. The boy dies in the trap set for Kerim, and the stepmother cradles her dead child in her arms. For this, she vows to get rid of Kerim. She consults with an old woman ("kempir") that she suspects the foal is helping the prince, and the old woman advises her to feign illness and send for her as her doctor. It happens thus, and the false doctor prescribes the heart of a black colt ("bir gara taýy ... ýüregini", in the Turkmen text). The sultan wonders where they can find one, but the stepmother points him to Kerim's foal. The sultan is reluctant to kill his son's pet foal, but the queen insists that he kills that horse. When Kerim returns from school, he finds the foal in tears, which reveals that they plan to kill it, so it will neigh three times to alert the boy to come rescue it. Kerim goes to talk to his father and allows the sultan to sacrifice the horse. The following day, Kerim is sent to school, when he hears the foal's neigh and asks to be dismissed by the mullah. The mullah forbids him, but the prince rushes home to stop the execution. Prince Kerim asks his father to be allowed a final ride on the horse, takes his rifle, his sword and a saddlebag with gold, and mounts it. He rides around in front of his father and asks the monarch if the foal befits him. The sultan concurs, but orders his son to dismount. However, Kerim whips the horse, which rises in the air and vanishes to a distant land, where Kerim and the horse help each other. The tale ends.

=== Shahzade and his Foal (Stebleva) ===
In a Turkmen tale translated as "Шахзаде и его жеребенок" ("Shahzade and his Foal") and published by Turkologist Iya Vasilyevna Stebleva, a padishah has two wives and a son by the first one. One day, his first wife dies, and the padishah sends his son to herd the horses by the beach. Suddenly, a horse comes out the sea and mates with one of the mares. Months later, a foal is born to the mare. The padishah gets his son out of the horse herd task and places him with a mullah to learn. His father also wants to gift him with one of the horses, and he chooses the foal that the sea horse sired. Years later, the padishah's second wife gives birth to a son, and he celebrates with a seven-day feast. The boy, named Shahzade, goes to the mullah and returns to groom his horse. He notices the horse is crying, and asks it the reason. The horse answers that the boy's step-mother plans to kill him with poisoned food. Heeding his warning, he does not eat the food. In another occasion, the step-mother digs up a hole in their yurt, fills it with spears and covers it. The horse warns him again and he avoid the pitfall, only for his half-brother to fall into the trap. The third time, the step-mother pretends to be ill and says her only cure is the heart of a black-tongued colt ("сердце жеребенка с черным языком", in the Russian translation). The padishah orders the horse's sacrifice. The day before, the horse conspires with the boy that it will whinny three times to call his attention, and he should tell his father he wants a last ride on the horse. The next day, it happens as the horse planned, Shahzade rides the animal to another city and establishes himself there. The stepmother says she got what she deserved, as the tale ends.

=== Prince and Foal ===
In a Turkmen tale translated to Russian as "Шазада и жеребенок" ("Prince and Foal"), a prince is born to a sultan, but his mother dies when he is nine years old. The stepmother dislikes the boy and suggests the sultan to let him work with their horses, for she secretly hopes they trample him. The sultan places his son to herd the horses by the river. At one time, he sees a horse from sea jump out of the water and take a fancy to a mare. In time, the mare gives birth to a foal, to which he becomes attached to. The queen then tells the sultan to hire a shepherd and place the prince in school to learn. The sultan goes to talk to his son, telling him to learn under the mullah, but rewards him with a choice of a horse for himself. The prince chooses the foal sired by the horse from the sea. The sultan questions the boy's choice, but he is adamant in his decision. The prince takes the foal home, feeds and grooms it. The queen gives birth to her own son, and the kingdom rejoices in a seven-day and seven-night celebration. One day, the prince returns from school to talk with the foal, and finds it in tears. The foal explains that they prepared a poisoned meal for him, some chapadi for him to eat and die. The prince avoids eating the chapadi and chooses the churek instead. The next day, the stepmother digs up a hole near the churek shelves, places three spears inside and covers it with felt. The prince goes to talk to the foal and finds it in tears again: the foal warns him about the deadly trap, so the prince decides to avoid eating anything. The stepmother bids him to eat the fresh churek she baked, but he declines, instead sending his half-brother to fetch some. The second prince falls into the trap and dies. The queen is angry that her plans backfired and consults with an old witch, who discerns that the foal is to blame for her failures, so they must get rid of the animal first. The witch then advises the queen to place some reeds under her bed, cover them with felt and pretend that her bones are breaking and aching. The queen does as instructed, and the sultan believes that she is ill with some affliction. The queen sends for the old witch, who prescribes that only the heart of a black-tongued foal ("сердцем жеребенка с черным языком", in the Russian translation) can cure her. The sultan questions where they can find one, and the witch suggests that the prince's colt could be one. The sultan goes to check on the foal and sees that its tongue is indeed black. The prince returns from his studies and goes to talk to the foal, which is crying for its possible sacrifice, now that the queen discovered its interference; thus, it will neigh to alert him: first when they take it by the bridle, then when they tie it up, and lastly when they hold up a knife to its throat. The sultan then goes to talk to his son about the queen's illness, and the prince pretends to agree to let them sacrifice his foal. The following morning, the prince hears the foal's neigh and asks the mullah to be dismissed, but the mullah forbids it. The foal neighs a second time, and the prince decides to leave school and rushes back home, just in time to stop the foal's execution. He asks the sultan for one ride on the foal, which the monarch allows. The prince saddles the horse, takes a khurjin with food and rides the animal around, then asks his father how he looks on the equine. The sultan admires his son, but asks him to dismount. To his surprise, the prince whips his horse and both fly away across the sky like a bird. They sight a town in the distance, land there and begin to live there. As for the queen, after all her failures, she lies down in bed and dies.

=== Goçgargulı and His Horse ===
In a Turkmen tale translated to Turkish as Goçgargulı ve Onun Atı ("Goçgargulı and His Horse"), an old man has a son named Goçgargulı and he spends the days fishing. One day, he falls ill and sends his son to fish. The boy tries to catch anything, to no avail. He tries one last time and manages to capture a very large fish which he brings to his father. The old man ponders about the large fish, and decides to skin it. When he does so, a meagre foal appears out of its belly. The old man realizes the foal is of a water horse stock, and dowses it with some water, then feeds it. Goçgargulı continues to groom the horse with food and water. When the boy is around fourteen or fifteen years of age and the foal has grown into a fine horse, Goçgargulı asks his father to earn a living. Thus he takes the water horse and rides to the mountains. He meets some hunters that work for the Shah of Egypt, and offers to be the Shah's son, or "a son to the sonless". The Shah agrees, but explains Goçgargulı he has two wives, one who already has a son and a second one that is childless. Goçgargulı accepts his terms and takes the water horse with him. Goçgargulı lives with the Shah and they travel together. One day, the Shah organizes a grand festival with horse racing and wrestling matches. Goçgargulı takes part in the games with his water horse, which defeats the prince's mount, to the Shah's surprise. The monarch asks Goçgargulı to race again, and again the boy defeats his adopted brother. For this, the Shah dotes on Goçgargulı, causing the second co-queen to become angry and choosing to kill Goçgargulı. She obtains some poison from a doctor. One day, Goçgargulı goes to talk to his horse, which cries for its friend's fate: the queen will give him poisoned rice, so he is to avoid eating the rice. Goçgargulı gives some rice to a cat, which eats it and dies, confirming the horse's words, so he pretends to lose his appetite. The co-queen notices that she cannot get rid of the boy without eliminating the water horse first, so she feigns illness and brings in an old woman to be her doctor and prescribe the meat of a water horse for her. The Shah's wife pretends to be very ill and her doctor accomplice convinces the court she needs the meat of a fast racer water horse, so the butchers prepare their instruments. Goçgargulı tries to stop them and hold them for enough time until the Shah returns from the hunt, but the angry queen urges them to work fast. As the butchers tie the horse's legs, the Shah arrives and is told of the need to sacrifice the horse for his wife's sake. The Shah gives his consent to kill the horse, but Goçgargulı asks for one last ride on the horse. The Shah allows it. Goçgargulı unties the horse, mounts it and tells it they will run away. The horse tells Goçgargulı to hold tight, for it runs straight at the old woman doctor and tears her in pieces, then takes Goçgargulı away from the city. The Shah realizes his wife was the cause of this deceit, and hangs her. The tale explains that the old witch and the wicked queen fell into the trap of their own making, as the tale ends.

=== The Orphan Boy and the Swift Horse ===
In a tale from a Turkmen source in Turkmen Sahra, Khorasan, translated to Turkish with the title Yetim Oğlan bilen Yıldam At ("The Orphan Boy and the Swift Horse"), a sultan has two wives, two sons by one and a son from the other. The wife who has a single son dies, leaving the half-brother to be mistreated by his stepmother growing up. One day, the king sends for his three sons and bids them choose their own horses from the stables, since he plans to nominate his successor from the son who wins a racing competition. The princes go to the stables; the elder princes choose nice foals, while the orphan prince chooses a lame-looking one, following the horse-groom's advice, who explains the lame-looking horse, despite its appearance, belongs to the stock of Yildam At (Swift Horses; "Ahal Teke", according to the translator). On the day of the competition, the princes race on their horses, but the orphan prince's horse beats the race, thus earning him the right to succeed their father. The stepmother queen promises that her sons will not call their half-brother king, and devises a stratagem to get rid of the horse: they dig a pit, place a spear inside it, and ready it for the horse to walk into the trap as soon as it arrives. Failing that, the queen feigns illness, to the sultan's worry, and lies that she needs the meat of the prince's Yildam At to cure her. The orphan prince goes to meet his mount, Yildam At, which begins to speak "with the grace of Allah" and tells the prince they intend to kill it, so they plan their escape: the horse will neigh to alert him. He rides the Yildam At away from the kingdom, with his father's soldiers chasing after him. On the road, the horse asks the prince the type of horse that is follow them: first a white horse, which they lead into a thicket of thorns, then a konur horse (a light chestnut horse) which they distract by riding towards the Sun, and finally a konur sakkar horse, which the prince's horse says it is its mother, so they just have to continue on their trail.

After he and the horse elude their pursuers, they stop to rest by a tree. The horse gives some strands of its hairs to the prince for him to burn it; doing so will summon the horse from the skies. The horse then departs. The orphan prince dons some beggar clothes and reaches a nearby city. Inside the city, the local ruler's three daughters are taking part in a suitor selection test: they are to release doves at random and whomever they land on, the princesses shall marry them. The princesses release the doves: the first lands on the vizier's head, the second on the deputy's head, and the third, belonging to the youngest princess, perches on the arriving beggar's head. The people complain that the beggar is unfitting to a princess, and the youngest princess releases it again and a third time, and again, and the third time it lands on the beggar's head. The king interprets that the princess is fated to marry the beggar, and agrees to marry her to the lowly suitor, despite some reluctance. One day, the king is riding along his "köregens" (advisors), when suddenly enemy armies ambush them. The orphan prince, disguised as a köregen, protects his identity and protects the king. During the battle, an enemy approaches the king and cuts his arm. The orphan prince bandages the king's arm with a piece of his own clothes. The king returns home and the royal doctors prescribe deer meat for the king's arm to be cure. The orphan prince hunts some deer and utter a prayer for Allah for the deer head to taste sweet and the rest of the body to be bitter, then brings a soup made of it to his father-in-law. The king declines it at first, but is convinced to it. The orphan prince then questions the king the reason for disliking him, and asks who saved him at the battlefield. The youngest princess reveals that her husband rescued her father, and the orphan prince removes his disguise, produces the sash to prove his identity. The king appoints his son-in-law as his heir. According to the collector, the tale was provided, in 2019, from a source named Meysem Bahshi, from the Teke tribe, in Gonbad-e Kavus, who heard it from khalifa Baylı Teke.

== See also ==
- The Black Colt
- Adventures of a Boy
- The Son of the Padishah and the Horse
- Bogatyr Neznay
- The Knights of the Fish
- The Twins (Albanian tale)
