= Saugstad =

Saugstad is a Norwegian surname.

Notable people with this surname include:

- Elyse Saugstad, American free skier
- Ola Didrik Saugstad (born 1947), Norwegian pediatrician
- Per Saugstad (1920–2010), Norwegian psychologist

== See also ==
- Mount Saugstad, a mountain in British Columbia, Canada
- Saugestad
