= Adventures of a Boy =

Folk tale
- Name: Adventures of a Boy
- Also known as: "Приключения мальчика"; "Похождения мальчика"
- Aarne–Thompson grouping: ATU 314 (Goldener)
- Country: Azerbaijan
- Related: The Black Colt; The Magician's Horse; Little Johnny Sheep-Dung; The Gifts of the Magician; Făt-Frumos with the Golden Hair; Donotknow; The Story of the Prince and His Horse; The Tale of Clever Hasan and the Talking Horse

Adventures of a Boy is the title of an Azeri folktale first collected in Russian language in the early 20th century.

It is related, in the international Aarne-Thompson-Uther Index, to tale type ATU 314, "Goldener", in that a boy and his friend horse escape from an attempt on their lives by the boy's parents, either on the boy or on the animal, and later he takes up a job as a king's gardener.

== Summary ==
=== First version ===
In an Azeri tale titled "Приключения мальчика" ("Adventures of a Boy"), first collected in Nukha and published in 1904, a woman has a son and a foal who are very close friends. However, their close proximity drives the boy apart from his studies and even work. Intent on ending their friendship, the woman calls for a doctor and confides in him that she will pretend to be ill, and the doctor must prescribe as a cure foal meat.

It happens thus: the woman's husband is told by the doctor that only the foal's meat can cure her, and goes to talk to their son about killing his pet horse. The boy goes to talk to the foal and explain it the situation. The foal then begins to talk and advises the boy to go to his lesson, then come back home and ask his father for a last ride; the boy then must hold tight to the horse's body and whip it hard.

The boy follows the horse's plan, and both ride away from his parents' house and into the forest. He hears a loud roar: it is a tiger who has devoured a deer, but its antlers were stuck in the tiger jaw. The boy cuts off the deer's antlers to help the tiger, and the feline, in gratitude, lets him have one of its cubs. The same thing happens to a lion further ahead: the boy cuts off the deer's antlers from the lion's maw and, in gratitude, the lion gives him one of its cubs.

Later, the boy and the feline cubs arrive at a city. The cubs tell the boy to let the horse with them for safekeeping, while he goes to the city to finds a job, and, should he need the cubs' help, he has but to clap his hands. The boy follows their advice and finds a job as the local king's gardener. One day, he summons the cubs, who bring with them the foal, and instructs them to dig out the garden for him, while he rides his horse for a while. These events are witnessed by the king's youngest daughter, who falls in love with the gardener.

Some time later, the princesses send three melons of different states of ripeness to their father, as analogy for their marriageability. His viziers correctly interpret the princesses' intention, and the king orders for all youth in the city to assemble in a crowd, for the princesses will throw apples to their suitors of choice. During the occasion, the elder princess throws hers to the son of the head vizier, the middle one to a nobleman's son, while the youngest withhold hers. The king then asks if there is any person who is not present at the gathering, and is told of the lowly gardener boy. The gardener is brought forth, and the youngest princess throws him her apple, to the king's consternation. The monarch insists his daughter repeats the action: she avoids any other suitor, save for the gardener, to whom she throws her apple.

The king celebrates his elder daughters' marriages, while the gardener takes the princess to a shack near the garden. Later, the king falls ill, and the royal doctors say that only deer meat may cure him. His two sons-in-law go on the hunt, and the gardener asks his wife if her father can get him a horse. The princess goes to talk to her father, but he, still furious at her choice of husband, rebuff her. Despite the setback, the gardener summons his cubs and his horse friend, and they ride away to hunt.

The boy orders the cubs to drive all the animals to a single spot in a gorge for a better hunt. Suddenly, he sights his brothers-in-law coming. The men ask for some carcasses, and boy agrees to give them some. as he slaughters them the deer, he declares that the taste should go to the head and legs of the animal. The brothers-in-law bring back the deer meat and their wives prepare a meal for their ailing father. The king eats their dishes, which are tasteless, and does not get better. The youngest princess, however, brings him a meal made of the deer's head and legs, and the king's health improves.

Some time later, the king gets word that a neighbouring king is poised to attack his city, and marches with his army to defend his kingdom. However, the enemy army overpowers his, until a mysterious knight appears in the battlefield accompanied by two animals, a tiger and a lion. The knight destroys the enemy army. The king goes to meet his strange saviour and notices a wound on his arm, so he takes off a handkerchief and bandages his hand, then returns to the city.

The next day, the king summons the people for a celebratory feast, and hopes he can see the mysterious knight who saved him. Among the guests, however, he cannot see anyone with a hand injury, and asks if everyone is at the feast. The guards inform that the gardener is missing, so he is also brought to the celebration. When the people wash their hands before eating their meal, the king notices the handkerchief and the wound on the gardener's hand, realizing he was the warrior at the battlefield. The monarch then gives his approval to his youngest daughter and appoints him as his heir.

=== Second version ===
In an Azeri tale published by Azeri folklorist Hanafi Zeynalli with the title "Похождения мальчика" ("Adventures of a Boy"), first collected in 1930, from a source in Nakhkray (Nakhchivan Autonomous Republic), a boy is very devoted to his friend, the horse, much to his mother's chagrin. She decides to apart the boy from the horse once and for all, by feigning illness and asking for horse meat as cure. The boy confides in the horse, which talks in a human voice that his father will sacrifice it, and hatches a plan with the boy: the boy is to come home from school, when he will hear the horse neighing for him; the boy is to ask for a ride, and, by whipping it, they will run off to any other place. It happens so: the boy and the horse ride away to another kingdom. On his journey, the boy saves a tiger and a lion from choking on their food, and in return they give the boy one of their cubs as companions. The retinue goes along the road; the cubs agree to look after the boy's horse while the human goes to look for a job in the city. The boy hires himself as apprentice to the royal gardener. One day, he summons his animal friends by clapping and rides around the garden - a scene that is seen by the king's youngest princess. The next day, the princesses deliver some melons to their father as a metaphor for their marriageability, and a suitor selection test is prepared for them: the princesses are to throw apples at their intended suitors. The elder throws her to the vizier's son, the middle one to the vekil's son, and the youngest to the gardener's apprentice. The youngest princess repeats the action and confirms her choice, to the king's disgust, who banishes her from the palace. Some time later, the king falls ill, and only deer meat can cure him. The three sons-in-law ride off to find deer meat, and the boy, with the aid of his animal companions (the tiger and the lion), catches the best meat to give to the king. Lastly, war erupts, and the king rides to battle. When his army is surrounded, the boy appears with the tiger and the lion and defeats the enemy army. He is injured in the left hand, and the king bandages him. At the end of the tale, the king prepares a grand celebratory feast and invites every person, and those that do not come are to be taken to the feast. The gardener's apprentice is taken to the banquet and, when he washes his hands, the king realizes he was the warrior at the battlefield. The compiler classified the tale as types 554 and 314, and listed it as a variant of the first version.

== Analysis ==
=== Tale type ===
In a review of Zeynalli's publication, Russian scholar Nikolai P. Andreev, who developed the first East Slavic Folktale Classification in 1929, classified the tale as type 532, "Neznaika".

Azerbaijani scholarship classifies the tale in the Azerbaijani Folktale Index as Azerbaijani type 532, "Ağ atlı oğlan" ("The Boy on the White Horse"). In the Azerbaijani type, the hero's stepmother feigns illness and wants to kill the horse; the hero asks for a last ride on the horse and both escape to another kingdom; on the road, the hero helps some animals and gains their help; in the distant kingdom, the hero defeats an entire army and is recognized by his dressed wound. However, in the international Aarne-Thompson-Uther Index (henceforth, ATU), the tale is classified as type ATU 314, "Goldener": a youth with golden hair works as the king's gardener. The type may also open with the prince for some reason being the servant of an evil being, where he gains the same gifts, and the tale proceeds as in this variant. Furthermore, German folklorist Hans-Jörg Uther, in his 2004 revision of the international tale type index, subsumed type AaTh 532 under a new tale type, ATU 314, "Goldener", due to "its similar structure and content".

==== Introductory episodes ====
Scholarship notes three different opening episodes to the tale type: (1) the hero becomes a magician's servant and is forbidden to open a certain door, but he does and dips his hair in a pool of gold; (2) the hero is persecuted by his stepmother, but his loyal horse warns him and later they both flee; (3) the hero is given to the magician as payment for the magician's help with his parents' infertility problem. Folklorist Christine Goldberg, in Enzyklopädie des Märchens, related the second opening to former tale type AaTh 532, "The Helpful Horse (I Don't Know)", wherein the hero is persecuted by his stepmother and flees from home with his horse.

American folklorist Barre Toelken recognized the spread of the tale type across Northern, Eastern and Southern Europe, but identified three subtypes: one that appears in Europe (Subtype 1), wherein the protagonist becomes the servant to a magical person, finds the talking horse and discovers his benefactor's true evil nature, and acquires a golden colour on some part of his body; a second narrative (Subtype 3), found in Greece, Turkey, Caucasus, Uzbekistan and Northern India, where the protagonist is born through the use of a magical fruit; and a third one (Subtype 2). According to Toelken, this Subtype 2 is "the oldest", being found "in Southern Siberia, Iran, the Arabian countries, Mediterranean, Hungary and Poland". In this subtype, the hero (who may be a prince) and the foal are born at the same time and become friends, but their lives are at stake when the hero's mother asks for the horse's vital organ (or tries to kill the boy to hide her affair), which motivates their flight from their homeland to another kingdom.

=== Motifs ===
A motif that appears in tale type 314 is the hero having to find a cure for the ailing king, often the milk of a certain animal (e.g., a lioness). According to scholar Erika Taube, this motif occurs in tales from North Africa to East Asia, even among Persian- and Arabic-speaking peoples.

Professor Anna Birgitta Rooth stated that the motif of the stepmother's persecution of the hero appears in tale type 314 in variants from Slavonic, Eastern European and Near Eastern regions. She also connected this motif to part of the Cinderella cycle, in a variation involving a male hero and his cow.

== Variants ==
=== Ali-khan ===
In an Azeri tale titled "Али-хань" ("Ali-khan"), in a certain kingdom, lives a rich merchant called Gadzhi-Murad with his wife Gulistan-khanum and son Ali-khan, who has silver hair and golden hair. When his father leaves on a business trip, he gifts his son a special black horse that can talk and knows the secrets of men. Whenever he can, Ali-khan consults with the animal. After her husband leaves, the boy's mother conspires with a paramour named Gamzat-bek to kill her husband and the horse, who can divulge their illicit affair. Aware of the danger, the black horse tells Ali-khan and advises the boy to ask for a last ride on the horse, three times around the property. Following the horse's plan, they seize the opportunity to kill Gulistan-khanum and flee to another kingdom. Ali-khan trades clothes with a beggar, hides his hair under a cap, calls himself "Kechal", then finds work as apprentice to the gardener of local king Ali-Mamed-khan. One day, he fashions bouquets for the three princesses (Guluzar-khanum, Asia-khanum and Khurshid-khanum), the youngest gets the most elaborate. Later, the princesses take part in a suitor selection ceremony by throwing apples to their intended; Guluzar-khanum, the eldest, to the vizier's son; Asia-khanum, the middle one, to the vekil's son; and Khurshid-khanum, the youngest, to Kechal. They marry. Some time later, Ali-Mamed-khan falls ill, and only venison meat can cure him. His three sons-in-law ride off to find venison, and Kechal finds it first. He dons fine garments and meets his brothers-in-law en route to the palace, and agrees to share the venison with them, in exchange for him branding their cheeks. The king is given the correct meat by Kechal and is cured. Next, a war erupts; Kechal summons the horse and defeats the enemies, getting hurt in battle and having his injury bandaged by the king. Ali-Mamed-khan goes to visit his daughter Khurshid-khanum and sees the bandage on Kechal's hand, finally realizing he was the one that saved the kingdom.

=== The Black Horse (Bilgəh) ===
In an Azeri tale titled "Черный конь" ("Black Horse"), also published by Hənəfi Zeynallı, a padishah has a son named Ibrahim. His wife dies and he marries another woman and fathers a son with her. The padishah then sends his two sons to school, and, after Ibrahim graduates, he gives his horses to the poor. One day, Ibrahim sees an old man guiding a black horse. He buys the animal and takes it with him to the stables, where he feeds it sweets. Meanwhile, the padishah's new wife, feeling that her husband loves his first wife's son instead of their child, begins to plot ways to kill her stepson: first, she gives poison to the cook to put it in Ibrahim's food; next, she tries to poison his sherbet. Ibrahim's black horse warns him against both attempts, and the boy avoids the danger. Her plans failing twice, the stepmother dyes her own skin to pretend she has jaundice, and her doctor lies to the padishah she needs to wrap her body in the black horse's hide to restore her health. The padishah tells Ibrahim they need to sacrifice his black horse, and the boy asks his father for one last ride on the animal with the saddle that belonged to his grandfather, Shah Mirza. Ibrahim rides on the animal and tells his father his stepmother's ploy, then gallops away from the kingdom. The padishah then orders his wife and the doctor to be executed. Back to Ibrahim, on the road, he sees a nest of Zumrut's chicks about to be attacked by a snake-like being named azhdaha, and kills the latter. The bird Zumrut appears and, in gratitude, offers one of its chicks to Ibrahim. Next, the boy helps an injured tiger in the forest and gains another companion. The group then make their way to a city swarming with troops, and Ibrahim learns they are to pay tribute to the local padishah, or to take princess Khurshud. Ibrahim decides to go into the city, and his black horse gives him some of its hairs to summon him. The boy takes shelter with an old woman, then summons his black horse to defeat the enemy army, getting hurt in the process. The local padishah learns of the mysterious saviour, the man on the black horse, and summons him to his presence. The padishah's daughter, Khurshud, recognizes Ibrahim as the son of Shah Shongar, and they marry. The compiler classified the tale as types 554 and 314, and sourced it from a teller named Abbas Nadir-oglu, from the village of Bilgəh, in Baku.

=== Black Horse (Lachin) ===
In an Azeri tale titled Qara at ("Black Horse"), collected by Azerbaijani literary critic Ehliman Ahundov, a king has a son named Ibrahim from a first wife, who has since died, and remarries, fathering a son with the second one. The king sends both boys to their lessons, and gives horses to the poor. One day, prince Ibrahim is coming back from his classes and meets an old farmer guiding a black colt. Ibrahim makes a trade with the farmer for the horse and brings it home with him, then builds a stable to house the animal without his father's knowledge. One day, Ibrahim is eating sweets in front of the horse when the animal neighs to call his attention, wanting the sweets. Ibrahim's stepmother notices her husband dotes on his first wife's son instead of their own child, and plans to get rid of the boy: first, she gives some poison to the cook to use it on Ibrahim's food. Before eats it, the boy goes to talk to his black horse, and it warns not to eat it and bring the plate to the stables. Failing the first attempt, the queen gives him a poisoned sherbet, which the horse also warns not to drink. The queen discovers the black horse is protecting him, dyes her skin with saffron to make it appear jaundiced, and bribes a doctor to prescribe the skin of a black horse as her cure. The king tries to look for a black horse everywhere, until he told about Ibrahim's horse in the secret stables. The king summons his son and explains the situation to him. He replies he wants to ride the horse with his grandfather's, Shah Mirza's, saddle, before the animal is sacrificed. Ibrahim saddles the horse and rides out of the stables, then shows his father the poisoned food and sherbet as proof of the queen's wickedness, and departs. Despite trying to block his son's path, the black horse opens its wings and flies away, and the king goes to check on his allegations. After confirming the queen tricked him, he orders both her and the doctor to be shot. Back to Ibrahim, he stops by a plantain tree and kills a snake with his sword that was menacing a nest of birds. The chicks' father, the Zumrud Anka bird, arrives soon after and, in gratitude, gives one of its chicks to the prince. Next, Ibrahim crosses a stream and helps a tiger in the forest, by removing a thorn from its paw. The tiger joins with Ibrahim. The group rides until they reach a city surrounded by a large army. Prince Ibrahim inquires a person about the presence of the army, and is told that the army is there to be paid the seven-year tribute that is due, or to take princess Khursid-alam ("Xurşidi-aləmi", in the original) with them. The black horse gives Ibrahim some of its hairs and tells the boy to go to the city. Ibrahim asks for shelter with a local old lady and gives her money to buy rice for them. He then burns his horse's hair, summons the helpful animals to his side and rides to defeat the enemy army, hurting his hands in the process. He then goes back to the old lady's hut to rest, while the local ruler searches for their saviour. The old lady tells the local king about a strange boy that has been living in her house. The king sends for the boy (who is Ibrahim), thanks him for defeating the army, and offers him his daughter, the princess, as bride. Princess Khurshid-alam enters the room and recognizes Ibrahim as the son of "padishah Şenqar", and marries him. Ibrahim then takes his wife and horse and returns to his father's kingdom. The tale was sourced from an informant named Abdulla Məhərrem oglu, from Laçın rayonu.

== See also ==
- The Black Colt
- The Son of the Padishah and the Horse
- Senever
