= The Son of the Padishah and the Horse =

Turkish fairy tale

The Son of the Padishah and the Horse (Turkish: Padişahın Oğlu ile Atı) is a Turkish tale collected from a source in Afyon. It is classified in the international Aarne-Thompson-Uther Index as ATU 314, "Goldener". It deals with a friendship between a king's son and a magic horse that are forced to flee for their lives due to the boy's mother, and reach another kingdom, where the boy adopts another identity.

Although it differs from variants wherein a hero acquires golden hair, its starting sequence (persecution by the hero's stepmother) is considered by scholarship as an alternate opening to the same tale type.

== Source ==
The tale was collected from informant Emine Cengelci, from Afyon.

== Summary ==
In this tale, a king has a son who likes to hunt. One day, he captures a sea horse on the beach and brings it to the stables, despite his father's objections, feeding it hay whenever he returns from school. The prince's mother falls in love with a foreign king and conspires with him: her lover advises her to feign illness and ask for the sea horse's liver a cure, that way they can get rid of the horse and the prince. The queen follows his instructions and asks her husband, the sultan, to sacrifice their son's horse for its liver. The sea horse talks to the prince, reveals the queen's deceit and plots a counterplan with the prince, who is to ask for a last ride on the sea horse on a gold saddle. The following morning, the prince agrees to sacrifice the horse, but asks his father for one last ride on the equine. The sultan agrees to indulge his son, who rides around the palace three times, then the horse flies away from the palace into the wilderness. The prince and the horse reach another land, where the prince trades clothes with a shepherd on the road and puts on a sheep's bladder on his head. The sea horse gives some hairs of its mane to the prince and gallops away.

The prince ventures into the new country and finds work with the local king's gardener. One day, the gardener asks his bald assistant to look after the garden while he is away, and the prince summons his sea horse to ride around the king's garden - an event witnessed by the youngest princess. The head gardener returns and complains to Keloglan about the destroyed garden, but the princess comes in the latter's defense and lies that a white horse stomped the flowers. This happens a second time, and a third time. The princess goes to talk to Keloglan and gives him some roast turkey stuffed with gold coins and a roast chicken to the head gardener, but Keloglan gives the stuffed turkey to the gardener.

Later, while the local sultan is meeting with his viziers, the third princess sends for Keloglan to deliver her father a plate with three watermelons. The Keloglan delivers the fruits to the king and the viziers, and the Grand Vizier correctly interprets it as analogy for the princesses' marriageability and their wishes to be married at once. Thus, the sultan sends the howler to call for suitors to gather at the palace for the princesses to throw an apple to their husband of choice. The elder princess chooses the Grand Vizier's son and the middle one the middle vizier, save for the youngest. The king sends for the missing bachelors, one of which the KEloglan, and the third princess throws her apple to the Keloglan. The king refuses to marry his daughter to the lowly gardener's assistant, and asks her to throw again, which she also tosses to Keloglan. The king relents and accepts his daughter's choice.

Then, the sultan is at war against the Rus king, and Keloglan asks his wife if her father can give him a mount and a sword. The princess says that Keloglan has his own horse, but Keloglan insists to be given a horse by her father. The princess asks the sultan for the equipment, and he says there is a lame mule and a single rifle for him. Keloglan dons the meagre equipment and goes to join the war. At a distance, he rubs the horse's hairs and summons it, and meets an old man on the road. The old man asks where Keloglan is going, then spits at the horse's mouth with a blessing for God not to strike him down, and explains that he is to make a salutation; whichever side salutes him back is the side he is to fight on. It happens thus and the prince joins with the sultan's army, then waits for the arrival of the Rus troops. He strikes down the troops, then returns to his lowly disguise as Keloglan, as his brothers-in-law pass by him and mention the mysterious youth who fought with them.

The following morning, Keloglan leaves his henhouse mounted on the lame mule, but summons his horse and rides to the battlefield. He promises to take the enemy Rus king by the beard. It happens thus, and the sultan beheads the Rus king, but accidentally injures the knight. The king dresses his wound with a kerchief the princess has sown, and he leaves the battlefield to return to the Keloglan disguise. The sultan passes by Keloglan trying to pull his mule from the swamp.

Later, the sultan loses his sight, and a doctor prescribes lion's milk as cure. The sons-in-law ride into the wilderness to find it. Keloglan asks his wife if the sultan can provide a horse, and the princess replies Keloglan has his own, but he insists on a mount given by the sultan. Thus, a lame mule is given to Keloglan. Out of sight, he summons his loyal horse and meets the same old man, who divines in a mirror the location of a lion that can provide the milk, if Keloglan removes the thorn from its paw. Keloglan rides to the lion's location and shoots an arrow at its paw. Realizing it has been helped, the lion promises to deliver its milk. The lioness's cubes appear and agree to let the human have its mother's milk, so Keloglan bottle some, then sets up tent to wait for his brothers-in-law.

The brothers-in-law arrive and recognize the man at the tent as the knight who saved their army, and ask for some lion's milk. The stranger, who they do not recognize as Keloglan, the gardener, agrees to a deal: the milk in exchange for marking their hips with his sea horse's hooves. A deal is made, but Keloglan gives them goat's milk instead, and rushes to the lame mule stuck in the mud to keep up appearances as his brothers-in-law pass him by. Keloglan sends his wife to the sultaness with a cup of lion's milk, which the princess gives to her father, the sultan. Despite some reservations, the sultaness dips the milk on the sultan's eyes, which improve a little. This occurs for the following two days, until the milk restores the sultan's sight.

The princess notices the kerchief with the royal seal with she sew on her husband's arm and asks the sultan where is the kerchief she made. The sultan says he has tied it around the knight's arm, and the princess admits her husband, Keloglan, is wearing it. The sultan goes to check for himself and realizes Keloglan was the knight who saved the kingdom, and orders some guards to take the asleep Keloglan to the palace. Keloglan wakes up in the palace, doffs his disguise and summons his horse to present himself before the sultan. He points to the hoof marks on the other sons-in-law hips, which match his horse's hooves. The sultan understand everything, and nominates Keloglan as his successor.

== Analysis ==
=== Tale type ===
The tale is classified in the Aarne-Thompson-Uther Index as type ATU 314, "The Goldener": a youth with golden hair works as the king's gardener. The type may also open with the prince for some reason being the servant of an evil being, where he gains the same gifts, and the tale proceeds as in this variant.

==== Introductory episodes ====
Scholarship notes three different opening episodes to the tale type: (1) the hero becomes a magician's servant and is forbidden to open a certain door, but he does and dips his hair in a pool of gold; (2) the hero is persecuted by his stepmother, but his loyal horse warns him and later they both flee; (3) the hero is given to the magician as payment for the magician's help with his parents' infertility problem. Folklorist Christine Goldberg, in Enzyklopädie des Märchens, related the second opening to former tale type AaTh 532, "The Helpful Horse (I Don't Know)", wherein the hero is persecuted by his stepmother and flees from home with his horse. (Note: According to Stith Thompson's 1961 revision of the index, in type 532 the hero's helpful horse advises him to answer every question with the sentence "I don't know".)

American folklorist Barre Toelken recognized the spread of the tale type across Northern, Eastern and Southern Europe, but identified three subtypes: one that appears in Europe (Subtype 1), wherein the protagonist becomes the servant to a magical person, finds the talking horse and discovers his benefactor's true evil nature, and acquires a golden colour on some part of his body; a second narrative (Subtype 3), found in Greece, Turkey, Caucasus, Uzbekistan and Northern India, where the protagonist is born through the use of a magical fruit; and a third one (Subtype 2). According to Toelken, this Subtype 2 is "the oldest", being found "in Southern Siberia, Iran, the Arabian countries, Mediterranean, Hungary and Poland". In this subtype, the hero (who may be a prince) and the foal are born at the same time and become friends, but their lives are at stake when the hero's mother asks for the horse's vital organ (or tries to kill the boy to hide her affair), which motivates their flight from their homeland to another kingdom.

=== Motifs ===
Professor Anna Birgitta Rooth stated that the motif of the stepmother's persecution of the hero appears in tale type 314 in variants from Slavonic, Eastern European and Near Eastern regions. She also connected this motif to part of the Cinderella cycle, in a variation involving a male hero and his cow.

==== The hero and his heroic mount ====
According to Turkish scholarship, in Turkic mythology horses can originate from the sky, from the wind, from a cave in the earth, or from the water.

===== Birth of hero and horse through apple =====
Turkologist Ignác Kúnos noted the existence of helpful magical horses in Turkish folklore: the Kamer Tay (Камӓр Таі) and the Sea-Horse (аіҕыр). The Kamar Tay is born from the same apple a Dervish gives to a childless padishah, when a mare eats the apple peels. The magical horse drinks rosewater and eats almonds. According to Turkish scholarship, in some folktales the hero and his incredible mount are born at the same time, after a holy person (a pir or a hazrat) gives the hero's father an apple, which is also shared by a mare.

In the Typen türkischer Volksmärchen ("Turkish Folktale Catalogue"), devised by scholars Wolfram Eberhard and Pertev Naili Boratav. According to their system, abbreviated as TTV, EbBo or EB, in type TTV 247, Schah Ismail (Turkish: Şah İsmail), a dervish gives an apple to a padishah; his wife gives birth to a son and his mare to a foal; some time later, the padishah's new wife has an affair with a vizier and conspires to kill her step-son, but the horse warns him; lastly, the stepmother feigns illness and asks for the horse's meat as a cure, which prompts their flight. Eberhard and Boratav also argued for the antiquity of the story, and that its "core elements" (birth of hero and foal; stepmother's adultery and threats; horse's warnings) already exist in the tale of Bey Börek.

===== The hero's Sea-Horse mount =====
Kúnos identified a second type of heroic mount in Turkish folklore: the Sea-Horse (аіҕыр), which lives in water, but can emerge and return to it; it comes at night to the surface to drink water and can be tamed if one places iron soles on its hooves. Sometimes the Sea-Horses are identified as children of a Wind Dev. According to Turkish scholarship, this sea-horse is the result of a mating between a mare and a stallion from the sea. Furthermore, the sea-born horse also appears in the folklore of Turkic peoples, either itself coming from a water body or being the result of a mating between a sea-stallion and a terrestrial mare.

==== Quest for the remedy ====
A motif that appears in tale type 314 is the hero having to find a cure for the ailing king, often the milk of a certain animal (e.g., a lioness). According to scholar Erika Taube, this motif occurs in tales from North Africa to East Asia, even among Persian- and Arabic-speaking peoples. Similarly, Hasan M. El-Shamy noted that the quest for the king's remedy appears as a subsidiary event "in the Arab-Berber culture area". In addition, Germanist Gunter Dammann, in Enzyklopädie des Märchens, noted that the motif of the quest for the remedy appeared "with relative frequency" in over half of the variants that start with the Subtype 2 opening (stepmother's persecution of hero and horse).

Eberhard and Boratav also indexed the episodes of obtaining lion's milk for the king and the war sequence as different tale types in the Turkish Folktale Catalogue, but they remarked they do not exist independently and that both are "closely related" to each other. In the first, indexed as TTV 257, Die Löwenmilch ("Lion's Milk"), the king falls ill and his sons-in-law have to find him the cure (milk from a lioness, but it may be from another animal); the hero finds it first and agrees to give it to his brothers-in-law in exchange for him branding their posteriors. In the second, titled TTV 258, Der unbekannte Krieger ("The Unknown Warrior"), war breaks out, and the hero rides into battle to turn the tide; he is injured, and his father-in-law dresses his wound.

==== Branding the brothers-in-law ====
According to German scholars Günther Damman and Kurt Ranke, another motif that appears in tale type ATU 314 is the hero branding his brothers-in-law during their hunt. Likewise, Ranke stated that the hero's branding represented a mark of his ownership over his brothers-in-law.

Ranke located the motif in the Orient and in the Mediterranean. In the same vein, Hungarian professor Ákos Dömötör, in the notes to tale type ATU 314 in the Hungarian National Catalogue of Folktales (MNK), remarked that the motif was a "reflection of the Eastern legal custom", which also appears in the Turkic epic Alpamysh.

== Variants ==
=== Turkey ===
==== Wind Horse (Erdemli) ====
In a Turkish tale from Erdemli with the title Padişah Oğlu ("The Padishah's Son") or Yel Ati ("The Wind Horse"), a padishah has a son and his wife dies, so he dotes on the boy. Convinced by his viziers, the padishah remarries when the prince is ten or twelve. By the same age, on a walk, the prince finds a lame and shabby horse which he asks his father to buy. The prince dotes on the horse and grooms it, until he becomes a fine horse. The horse is also a wind horse, which can talk and only the prince can hear it. One day, the prince surprises his stepmother and the vizier in bed. Thus the illicit lovers plan to kill the boy to hide their affair by poisoning his food: first, a dish of poultry and chicken entrails; next, a goose dish; lastly, a turkey dish. With the horse's warnings, the prince, called Shah Muhammed, avoid eating each dish. The new queen and the vizier suspect the prince is being warned by someone, and deduce the horse is the one helping him. Thus, the queen feigns illness and vizier bribes the doctors to prescribe the meat of a wind horse as cure. The padishah is convinced to kill the animal. The next day, Shah Muhammed goes to visit his horse in the stables, which, in tears, tells the boy they plan to sacrifice it, and plots a way they can escape: the prince is to ask for a last ride on the horse and, after a javelin game, he will give up the horse, but he is to ask for gold and take the opportunity to flee. The prince feigns ignorance and goes to meet his father, who explains the situation. The prince then asks for his belongings and a golden saddle, throws a javelin, and whips the horse three times. This causes the horse to fly away with the prince on its back, while the padishah cries until he falls blinds. When the wind horse lands in another country, it gives the prince some of its hairs and rides away with his belongings. The prince then buys a bald shepherd's clothes, puts a sheep's rumen on the head and dons the disguise of a Keloglan, then finds work in the king's garden. On three successive Fridays, the royal gardener orders his assistant to watch over the garden from children intruders. While the gardener is away, Keloglan summons the horse by burning its hairs, takes a ride around the garden and tramples everything, then dismisses his mount. The gardener comes back and scolds Keloglan for the ruined garden, but the princess intervenes on his behalf. The princess falls in love with the Keloglan and sends him a dish of chicken filled with gold, but Keloglan trades it for a chicken and rice dish destined for the gardener. Some time later, the three princesses talk to their father, the king, about their marriage plans: the elder wants to marry the right vizier's son, the middle the left vizier's son, while the cadette wants to toss an apple to her suitor from a crowd of eligible people. The king gathers a crowd to stand under the palace's window, but the princess withholds her apple. The king then sends for the Keloglan, to whom the princess throws her apple, indicating her choice. The king then falls ill and the doctors prescribe lion's milk. The king's sons-in-law gather each their own army and ride to find the remedy, while Keloglan is given a lame mule to ride on. While no one is looking, he summons his loyal horse and asks it to be taken to the king of lions to request the milk. Keloglan reaches the lion's pride and asks for the milk, and notices his brothers-in-law are coming. Keloglan tricks the duo by giving them she-donkey's milk in exchanging from branding their backs. The king's sons-in-law give him the wrong milk and his health worsens, then Keloglan gives him the right one and he improves. Later, war breaks out, and the king sends his sons-in-law into battle. Keloglan wants to join the fray, and is given another lame mount. Again, he summons his horse and rides into battle, injuring his wrist in a fight. His father-in-law, the king, goes to meet the mysterious newcomer and asks if he is friend or foe, to which the stranger replies he is the king's friend. The king notices the knight's injury and dresses his wound with a handkerchief. The prince rides away from battle and resumes his Keloglan disguise with his wife. The princess notices her father's handkerchief and brings the monarch to meet his saviour. The king recognizes his handkerchief, and orders his soldiers to tie Keloglan inside a carpet and bring the youth to the palace. It happens thus, and Keloglan wakes up on the king's bed. He tries to maintain his lowly disguise, but the king tells him he found the handkerchief. Keloglan then tells the truth and resumes his princely identity, saying he would like to take his wife, the princess, back to his kingdom. The king allows it and gives him a retinue. Before Shah Muhammed enters his home kingdom, the wind horse says the padishah is blind, and earth from its hooves can cure him. Shah Muhammed fetches some earth and cures his father. The padishah learns of his wife's affair, and hangs both her and the vizier.

==== Wind Horse (Gaziantep) ====
In a Turkish tale collected from an informant in Gaziantep with the title Yel Atı ("Wind Horse"), a padishah has no children, until he has a son by his wife, who then dies. Later, when the boy is but ten or twelve years old, the padishah's ministers advise him to remarry. When the prince is walking with his father one day, the boy finds a lousy horse, which he insists to bring home with him. The padishah allows it, and the boy grooms and feeds the lousy horse until it grows into a fine steed. The horse is no ordinary animal, for it is a Wind Horse, able to speak, but only the prince can understand it. One day, the prince discovers his stepmother in bed with the vizier, but keeps it a secret. The queen conspires with the vizier to kill the prince to hide her affair, first by giving the prince a poisoned dish with chicken. The prince goes to talk to the horse in the stables, and finds it crying. The Wind Horse, which heard the queen's plan, warns the prince, Shah Muhammad, to avoid the food. The next day, the queen tries again with some poisoned goose, and on the third day, with some poisoned turkey, which the prince avoids eating. The vizier supposes the prince is being helped, and correctly deduces it is the Wind Horse in the stables. He then plots with the queen to feign illness and the doctors to prescribe the meat of a wind horse as remedy. The queen dyes her skin and hides some bread under the sheets to pretend her bones as cracking. The padishah falls for the trick and decides to sacrifice his son's horse. Shah Muhammed goes to the stables and finds his horse crying again, this time for itself, for the queen plans to sacrifice it, but the prince can save it: when the padishah announces the next day about his decision, the prince is to ask for a last ride on the horse on the square for the cirit games, gather his belongings in a golden saddle, and nail iron nails into the horse's hooves. The next day, it happens as the horse predicted, and, while they are throwing javelins, it asks the prince to whip three times, to they escape through the air to another land. The padishah cries for his son's vanishing, becomes blind, and leaves the king to be ruled by his wife and the vizier. Back to the prince, the horse lands and thanks him for saving it, gives two hairs to the prince to burn in case he needs the horse's help, and rides away. The prince then trades clothes with a shepherd, hiding his royal pedigree under the Keloglan disguise, and enters another kingdom, where he finds work as a gardener's assistant. Some time later, the prince, as the gardener assistant, is instructed by the gardener to guard the royal garden from some rambunctious children who will play and destroy it, when everyne has gone to pray on Friday. After the gardener leaves, the prince summons his horse, rides around the garden, then dismisses his friend. The gardener returns and the prince spins a story that some forty knights invaded the garden. The princess vouches for him, and the story repeats for two subsequent Fridays. The princess falls in love with the Keloglan, and sends him two dishes: a chicked with golden and a chicken filled with rice. Keloglan accepts the gifts, but retains the edible one. Keloglan surmises the princess is in love with him. As for the princess, she and her sisters tell the sultan their marriage plans: the elder wants to marry the son of the right vizier, the middle one the son of the left vizier, and the youngest wishes to throw an apple for her suitor of choice. Callers assemble a crowd under the sultan's palace for the princess to cast her lot, but Keloglan is not among them. The sultan then orders his soldiers to bring the gardener's assistant to the gathering, and the princess throws the apple to him. The sultan is enraged at this turn of events and banishes his cadette to the goose coop. He falls ill with disgust, and the doctors warn that only lion's milk can restore him. The sons-in-law each depart with a retinue in search of lion's milk, while Keloglan is given a lame mount. While he is out of sight, he burns one of its horse's hairs and summons the wind horse, asking to be taken to the sultan of lions to request its milk. Shah Muhammed talks to the sultan of lions, which gives him the milk of a newly nursing lioness. While en route back to the kingdom, Shah Muhammed meets his brothers-in-law and makes a deal: the milk (which he exchanges for she-donkey's milk) in exchange for branding their backs with a seal. The sons-in-law returns with the wrong milk, which worsens the sultan's health, until Shah Muhammed, donning the disguise of a Keloglan again, gives the correct milk to his wife, who delivers to her father. The sultan's condition improves. Later, war breaks out, and the sultan's sons-in-law march into battle. Keloglan is also given a lame mount, but summons his horse again and rides into battle to save his father-in-law's kingdom, taking the enemies' weapons as battle trophies. He then meets the sultan, who notices his bleeding arm and bandages it with his own gem-encrusted handkerchief. The knight vanishes from the battlefield and the prince resumes his lowly Keloglan disguise, lying on the goose coop to rest from the battle. The princess notices her father's handkerchief on her husband and summons the sultan to see for himself: her husband Keloglan is their saviour at the battlefield. The sultan takes Keloglan to his chambers and confronts him about the ruse, Keloglan confesses everything, and reveals his princely origin as Shah Muhammed. Shah Muhammad decides to depart with his wife to his father's kingdom, where he learns he has gone blind. The prince returns home and uses the sand encrusted on his wind horse's hooves to cure his own father's blindness. The padishah rejoices at reuniting with his son, then learns of his wife's deception. He hangs the queen and the vizier, and celebrates a new marriage for Shah Muhammed.

==== Other tales ====
German scholar Ulrich Marzolph located another narrative from the Ottoman Turkish work Ferec baʿd eş-şidde ('Relief After Hardship'), an anonymous book dated to the 15th century. In tale nr. 32 of the compilation, titled The Baldheaded Gardener and the daughter of the King of Yemen, the son of the king of Pārs falls in love with the princess of Yemen, Fakhr al-Nisāʾ, and goes to her kingdom to meet her. The princess goes to her garden, and, since everyone is forbidden to look at her during her sojourn, the prince does and is arrested. Later, he is released by the Yemeni king and disguises himself as a lowly man with a sheep's rumen on his head, so as to appear bald, then hires himself as the king's gardener's assistant, so he can be close to the princess. During his daily work, he sings and plays instruments, which attracts the princess's attention and inspires love in her heart. A spurned suitor, the King of Morocco, takes his troops to invade the realm; the prince joins in the fight and defeats the enemy army, then marries the princess of Yemen.

=== Bulgarian Turks ===
In a Bulgarian Turk tale collected by Turkologist Nimetullah Hafız titled Keloğlan ile Kemer Tay ("Keloglan and Kemer Tay"), a bey is childless. One day, he meets an old man on the road who gives him an apple to be given to his wife and the peels to the mare: a boy is born to the bey and a colt to the mare which becomes a fine horse. The bey gives his son to a tutor to be raised in a secluded place. One day, the boy sees sunlight coming in through the wall and tries to touch it. One day, the bey leaves to another country, and the boy, called Şah İsmail, is left alone with his mother. The woman takes up lovers on the bey's absence and one day receives an Arab lover. The Arab wants to marry the woman, who declines the proposal since she has a son. Thus, the Arab suggests she kills the boy: first, the Arab brings some poison which the woman puts in some cooked eggs. Shah Ismail goes to talk to his horse, Kemer Tay, and finds it crying. The horse warns the boy of the poisoned food and advises him to give it to the cat. During the meal, Shah Ismail gives the eggs to the cat, which eat it and dies, then tosses the food in the field. Next, the woman gives her son some rigged clothes, so the horse warns the boy of the clothes that will kill him. Shah Ismail tosses the clothes in the fire to burn them. The bey returns home and his wife requests Kemer Tay is to be slaughtered. Shah Ismail asks his father to ride the equine a last time, saddles it with quivers of gold, reveals his mother and the Arab's conspiracy, and flees from home. On the road, he comes across a shepherd, buys a sheep from him and cooks it. Kemer Tay tells Shah Ismail he needs but to summon him, then gallops away. Shah Ismail makes a cap from the sheep's entrail and names himself Keloglan, and finds work as a gardener in a bey's rose garden. When the bey goes to a gathering, Shah Ismail summons the horse, tramples the entire garden, then dismisses the horse and places some bushes on himself. When the bey returns, Keloglan lies that some people came to attack the garden. The bey's daughter has seen the event and falls in love with him, but he pays no attention to her. Later, war breaks out, and the bey summons his sons-in-law and brothers to war. His daughter suggests Keloglan should join the battle, so the bey mockingly gives the boy a lame mount. Out of sight, Keloglan summons Kemer Tay to his side, rides into battle, defeats the enemy army, then rides away from the battlefield and resumes his lowly disguise, passing by the lords with his lame mount. The girl is surprised at her father's survival, and the bey reveals a boy has saved them. The girl asks Keloglan about the war and he says that he rode into one side and out through the other. Some time later, the bey becomes blind, and the royal doctors prescribe a wolf's milk as cure. The bey's daughter suggests Keloglan should find them the remedy, so they give him a lame mount, while other ride to find the milk. While he is out of sight, Keloglan summons Kemer Tay again, rides into the wilderness and finds the wolf's milk. As Shah Ismail leaves, he says some riders will appear to fetch the milk, but they are to be given donkey's urine instead. Shah Ismail then rides back to his lowly disguise and the lame mount. The bey's riders bring back donkey's urine and smear it on the bey's eyes, worsening his condition. His daughter suggests they bring in Keloglan, who brought the real remedy. The bey agrees to use the remedy and regains his sight. His daughter says Keloglan was the one who did it, but he dismisses her claims, so she reveals Keloglan has a horse that accompanies him. The bey then demands Keloglan presents himself in war garb and on the horse. Thus, Keloglan doffs the lowly disguise and appears as Shah Ismail to him. The bey recognizes that Shah Ismail is a good match to his daughter, and marries them to each other.

=== Turks of Romania ===
In a Turkish tale collected from a source in Romania (Dobruja) with the title Mahmut Pehlivan, a poor couple is childless and their horse does not foal. The husband climbs a mountaintop and begs Allah for a son and for their mare to foal. An old man appears and gives him an apple, for the peels to be given to the mare and to be eaten by him and his wife; if a son and a foal are born, he is to remain nameless until the old man comes to name him. The man agrees, takes the apple and shares it with his wife and the mare. In time, a boy is born to the couple and a foal to the mare. The boy grows up and goes to school, but he is mocked for not having a name. The old man returns to name the child, calling him Mahmut Pehlivan, and the horse Kamertay, blessing it to fly away at the first moment of hardship. Mahmut Pehlivan is so strong, he grabs and throws those that mock him. Eventually, his mother dies, and his father remarries. One day, Mahmut Pehlivan comes back from school, and his stepmother prepares the table. The foal, Kamertay, warns the boy the food is poisoned, so she should avoid it. Mahmut Pehlivan goes to eat, but calls the cat and gives it food. The cat eats it, spins seven times, and faints. The following day, the boy returns home and goes to talk with the foal, which warns that his stepmother sewed a poisoned shirt that will make his flesh fall off. His stepmother tries to convince him to put on the shirt, but Mahmut Pehlivan declines. The stepmother suspects someone somehow is spying on her, and goes to investigate: at one time, the woman sees Mahmut Pehlivan talking to Kamertay, who tells him his stepmother is hiding behind the door. With this new information, the woman returns home, hides some flatbread under the bed and feigns illness, then lies to her husband she needs to eat Kamertay's flesh. Her husband is convinced to slaughter the foal, and tells his son about it. The man brings forty men and raises the fences to block the foal from escaping. Mahmut Pehlivan returns home and cannot find Kamertay, then goes to the courtyard and finds his foal ready to be sacrificed. The boy asks the reason for such, and his father informs him of the stepmother's illness. Mahmut Pehlivan then asks his father to take a ride on Kamertay for a while, which his father allows. He takes his father's golden sword, climbs the foal, circles three times, then flies away. On the flight, Mahmut Pehlivan reveals his stepmother is lying to him and is well, then that she tried to poison him. He departs to another place and reaches a village, where an old grandfather lives. The grandfather is tending his garden and some watermelons, when Mahmut Pehlivan arrives and explains his story. The old grandfather asks if the boy can live with him as his child, which he agrees to do, provided the foal is given watermelon rinds. Sometime later, a letter comes, summoning the old grandfather to war. Since he is too old, Mahmut Pehlivan offers to go instead, despite his young age. Mahmut Pehlivan presents himself to the army officers, who dismiss the boy as too frail-looking and order the soldiers to attack him, but Mahmut Pehlivan and Kamertay defeat them. Mahmut Pehlivan joins the fray and defeats the enemy army, brings the flag and some money to his old grandfather. The old grandfather tells Mahmut Pehlivan there will be a wrestling match the following day. Mahmut Pehlivan attends the wrestling match, since his parents will be watching, and fights a strong girl as his opponent. Mahmut Pehlivan tells his female foe about his stepmother, and the girl offers to lose the match. After the combat, on whose result there is a bet, the stepmother urges him to cut off the girl's head, but Mahmut Pehlivan says he cannot do it, and tells his stepmother she can come and do it herself. She goes to the arena and grabs the sword, when Mahmut Pehlivan grabs her arm and mocks her, asking her if she wants forty lashes or forty camels. The woman answers: forty camels. Thus, Mahmut Pehlivan ties his stepmother to forty camels, takes the money bet on him and gives it to his father, telling him never to bring a stepmother to their house again. The tale ends.

=== Other regions ===
==== Karapapakh people ====
In a tale from the Karapapakh people with the title Bey Böÿrek, a padishah is childless. A hizir appears and gives him an apple to be given to his wife and the mare, but he must wait until the hizir returns to name the boy. The queen eats the apple and the peels are given to the mare. In time, the queen gives birth to a son and the mare to a foal. People gather to name the boy, some suggesting Ahmet or Mohammed, when the Hizir returns and gives the boy the name "Bey Böyrek". Some time later, the queen dies, and the sultan remarries. The new queen dislikes her stepson. One day, Bey Böyrek hears a sound coming from the stables, and finds his horse, Benliboz, crying. The horse warns the prince his stepmother will try to kill him. When the prince returns from school, he goes to talk with the horse and finds it crying again, this time warning the boy he must not wear any clothes his stepmother gives him, and he must meet a man in the market and buy from him another garment. Failing that, the stepmother poisons the padishah's mind about the boy, and convinces him to kill the horse. Bey Böyrek learns of this and persuades the padishah to let him take a last ride on the horse. It happens thus, and the prince rides around the patio three times, then jumps over a wall and escapes with the horse to another land. In this new kingdom, Bey Böyrek is told the king wishes to marry his daughter to anyone who can bring him the water of life. He rides into the wilderness ahead of the king's soldiers and meets a creature to whom he explains the reason for his quest. The creature mixes a bag of wheat and a bag of barley, and gives it to Bey Böyrek with a lesson. Bey Böyrek does his ablutions and prayers, and in the following morning, meets the messenger of Allah, who brings him the water of life from a tree. Bey Böyrek takes the water of life to the king. As a second trial, he takes part in a horse race, and lastly, as a third trial, he has to fly overhead with the horse. Bey Böyrek beats the challenges and marries the princess.

==== Yörük people ====
In a tale from the Yörüks, collected in Ustrumca, Eastern Macedonia, from informant Paşi Bekirov, with the title Sevgimülük ıle Temeltay ("Sevgimülük and Temeltay"), a couple have no children, and the woman prays to Allah for one, vowing never to go to the Az orchard again. One day, they welcome an old man into their house and he offers them an apple, to be given to the wife and their mare. The following morning, the woman asks to eat the apple, and they share it with the mare, but they are to wait until the man returns to name the child. It happens thus, and the woman becomes pregnant and gives birth to a son and their mare foals. Years pass, and they keep waiting for the old man to return and name the child, who complains that his friends keep calling him Nameless. On the third year, they prepare a feast with ash-baked bread and invite the people, when the old man appears after all this time. The man names the boy Sevgimülük and the horse Dengiboz. Sevgimülük and the foal grow up and become friends, visiting it after school. The boy's father is living in a shed away from the main house in the As garden. One day, Sevgimülük visit Dengiboz and finds the foal crying. The boy asks the reason for its tears, since it is fed with sugar-sweetened water and roasted chickpeas and raisins. Dengiboz warns that Sevgimülük's mother is having an affair with someone, and she plans to give him poisoned sherbet when he goes back home to kill him, so he is to avoid eating it. Sevgimülük goes home, is offered the sherbet, but drops it in the chicken trough. Their geese eat the poisoned sherbet and become ill, confirming the horse's words. Sevgimülük feigns ignorance and asks his mother if something happened to the geese.

Failing that, Sevgimülük visit his foal friend again and it reveals his mother and her lover planned to have her feign illness by sleeping on some crumbable yufka flatbread to appear as if her bones are breaking, and ask to kill the horse, Temeltay, as remedy for her. Sevgimülük returns home, confirms that his mother is pretending to be ill, but feigns ignorance and asks which remedy she needs: Temeltay's liver for her to eat. Sevgimülük goes to talk to Temeltay and urges it to flee. The boy jumps on the foal's back and it flies off to another country. They land, Dengiboz bids the boy to take a tuft of its hairs and warm them to summon him, then to buy a sheep from a nearby shepherd and use the tripe on his head. Dengiboz foretells that the boy will appear as a lowly baldhead to people, but as a handsome youth to the local padishah's youngest princess, whom he is to marry. The boy does as the foal instructed and enters the local lord's garden as a baldhead. The following morning, the padishah's three daughters finds him and smack him on the head with some flowers. The cadette princess perceives him as a handsome youth, and asks them to leave him alone and let him sleep in the garden.

Sometime later, the padishah notices it is time to marry his daughters, and bids them fetch three watermelons from the garden. The elder princess finds one that is ripe, the middle one finds one that is just right to be given away, and the youngest plucks a fruit that still has a flower on the stem, showing she has time yet. Domazet arranges suitors for the elder two, since they have reached marriageable age, while the youngest princess asks her father to have a golden apple made for her. The monarch brings the golden apple, and they assemble a crowd of suitors before the palace, for her to stand on the balcony and throw the apple to her suitor of choice. However, the procession walks by and she withholds the apple, since her intended is not there. The elder princesses mention the Arab, the bald boy in the garden, and the soldiers bring him. The princess throws her apple to the baldhead, marking her choice of husband. The padishah feels offended and orders his youngest daughter to be moved with the baldhead to the goose shed.

Soon enough, the padishah becomes blind, with his eyes shut tight, so a remedy is prescribed: the milk of a specific bird. He sends his sons-in-law to fetch the bird's milk in the mountains. Sevgimülük asks his wife to bring him a horse, but they give him a lame mule. At a distance, he climbs off the lame mule, rubs Temeltay's hairs and summons his foal friend. Temeltay learns of the padishah's plight, and warns Sevgimülük the journey is a dangerous one, since the remedy is located between two crushing mountains. Sevgimülük rides Temeltay to the two crushing mountains, rides between them as Sevgimülük fills a small bottle and leaves unscathed from the other side. Temeltay advises Sevgimülük to fill a second bottle with mere water, while keeping the bird's milk to himself. On the road back, Sevgimülük meets his brothers-in-law, whom they do not recognize. Sevgimülük offers the milk, in exchange for branding his buttocks with the Baldhead's seal. A deal is made, but Sevgimülük gives them the false bottle. The sons-in-law returns to the padishah's palace and apply the sour water on his eyes, worsening his situation. The youngest princess come with the real remedy and offers to douse his eyes with it.

Next, the padishah sends his sons-in-law to hunt some rabbits, since he wants to eat rabbit stew. Sevgimülük summons Dengiboz (Temeltay) and tells it about the second request. Temeltay explains there are two types of rabbit, one whose meat is sweet and another bitter and inedible. Sevgimülük asks to be given the better one, while he delivers the bitter meat to the others. The brothers-in-law meet Sevgimülük and ask for the rabbit meat. Sevgimülük agrees to a deal: the rabbit meat for being branded on their backs. A deal is made, and the sons-in-law return home with the meat. They give the bitter one first, while Sevgimülük's wife prepares the stew with the better meat, which she says was brought by her baldhead son-in-law.

Sometime later, war erupts, and the two sons-in-law ride to battle. Sevgimülük rides a lame mule, but, at a distance, summons Temeltay. The horse foretells that he will ride past his in-laws, who will admire his prowess, unaware of his identity; Sevgimülük will defeat the enemies, but hurt his finger, which his father-in-law will want to dress with a golden handkerchief. Sevgimülük rides into battle, passing by the padishah, who admires the newcomer's presence and lamenting about his lowly baldhead son-in-law. Sevgimülük defeats the enemies and hurts his finger. The padishah notices this and dress his wound with a golden handkerchief. They return home and the padishah complains to the baldhead he prefer his two other sons-in-law. Fed up with the mockery, Sevgimülük removes the sheep tripe and shows him the golden handkerchief, repeating the padishah's words to the mysterious rider. Sevgimülük then bids the padishah to call for his sons-in-law and for them to show their backsides. The sons-in-law appear and show their branded backsides, as Sevgimülük accuses them of stealing the bird's milk and the rabbit meat. The monarch banishes the sons-in-law and reconciles with Sevgimülük.

== See also ==
- Neznaiko
- Nemtudomka (Hungarian folktale)
- The Black Colt
- Bogatyr Neznay
- Senever
