= Marte Wexelsen Goksøyr =

Norwegian actress

Marte Wexelsen Goksøyr (born 1982) is a Norwegian actress, public speaker, writer and public debater. Born with Down syndrome, she has made a public stance against stigmatisation of disabled people and against selective abortions.

== Early life and education ==
Goksøyr grew up in Nittedal and has seven siblings. She later moved to Oslo. She studied drama at Hartvig Nissen School and at Romerike folk high school.

== Theatre and documentary ==
In 2004, Goksøyr played the lead role in Cinderella, a piece she had co-written. The play was performed at the Torshov Theatre. She played the role of Kamomilla in When the Robbers Came to Cardamom Town in 2004.

She was featured in the 2007 NRK documentary Bare Marte (Just Marte). Together with Siv Svendsen, she has written the play "Jeg svarte på en drøm" (I answered a dream) which is partly based on her own life and she played one of the two characters. The piece has been performed at the National Theatre in Oslo.

== Public views ==
In 2011, VG published an op-ed headlined "Utrydningstruet" (English: Endangered) by Goksøyr where she opposed a proposal to offer Norwegian women obstetric ultrasonography at week 12 during pregnancy in order to screen for fetus defects, including Down syndrome. She compared the proposal to the practice of killing disabled children in Nazi-Germany. Parliamentarian Laila Dåvøy of the Christian People's Party subsequently invited Goksøyr to the Parliament of Norway. After a meeting where Prime Minister Jens Stoltenberg had answered questions in the Parliament related to the proposal, Goksøyr approached him in the hall with questions regarding the proposal wearing a T-shirt with the inscription "Utrydningstruet" (Endangered). The event created much media attention. Members of other parties criticised the Christian People's Party for having invited her to the hall area of the parliament.

In 2012, Goksøyr published the book Jeg vil leve (English: I want to live) which both focused on her own life as a person with Down syndrome and political issues related to the disorder. The book contained interviews with then Prime Minister Jens Stoltenberg, mayor of Oslo Fabian Stang, Goksøyr's parents and others.

During the NRK broadcast of the Norwegian Constitution bicentennial 2014, Goksøyr spoke in favour of a diverse and inclusive society and against selective abortion of fetuses with Down syndrome.

== Awards and recognition ==
Goksøyr has received several awards and was the first Norwegian woman to be awarded the Bjørnson Prize.

- Honorary Award from the Norwegian Association for Persons with Developmental Disabilities (2009)
- Donation award in remembrance of Wenche Foss (2011)
- The Bjørnson Prize (with Ola Didrik Saugstad) (2011)
- Stolhetsprisen (English:: The Pride Prize). Awarded by the Norwegian Association of the Disabled and the Norwegian Association for Persons with Developmental Disabilities. (2012)
- Livsvernprisen (English: The Protection of Life Prize) Awarded by the organization Menneskeverd. (2012)
