= Gösta Rooth =

Swedish physician

- Born: 17 December 1918; Stockholm
- Died: 21 February 2008 (aged 89)
- Known for: Research on the interaction of maternal and fetal acid–base balance and fetal metabolism during labor
- Spouse: Anna Birgitta Rooth
- Scientific career
- Fields: Medicine (neonatology)
- Institutions: Uppsala University Hospital
- Doctoral students: Ola Didrik Saugstad

Gösta Rooth (born 17 December 1918 in Stockholm, died 21 February 2008) was a Swedish physician and a pioneer of perinatal medicine.

He graduated as a physician at Lund University in 1945 and obtained his PhD, also at Lund, in 1949. He became reader at Lund University in 1958. In 1973, he became Professor of perinatal medicine at Uppsala University Hospital, as the first person to hold a chair in that discipline in Europe.

He early took an interest in respiratory physiology. He began to study the fetal respiration in 1950, and is noted particularly for his work on the interaction of maternal and fetal acid–base balance and fetal metabolism during labor.

He was an honorary member of the Finnish and Italian Societies of Perinatal Medicine. He received the Maternity Prize of the European Society of Perinatal Medicine in 1980. He was a co-founder and chairman of the European Society for Perinatal Medicine. The journal Perinatology Neonatology featured a painting of him on a 1984 cover as "the face of perinatal medicine." In 2003, he received an honorary doctorate at the University of Zurich for his "pioneering research into fetal oxygenation and his commitment to the critical evaluation and propagation of methods for detecting and preventing hypoxia in the fetus and neonate."

He was a son of the prominent economist and managing director of the International Monetary Fund, Ivar Rooth. He was married to the ethnologist Anna Birgitta Rooth, and they had three children.
