= Zinaida Mirkina =

- Born: January 10, 1926; Moscow, Russian SFSR, Soviet Union
- Died: September 21, 2018 (aged 92); Moscow, Russia
- Citizenship: Soviet Union (1926—1991) Russia (1991—2018)
- Education: Moscow University
- Spouse: Grigori Pomerants
- Writing career
- Language: Russian
- Notable awards: Bjørnson Prize
- Website: pomeranz.ru

Zinaida Alexandrovna Mirkina (Russian: Зинаида Александровна Миркина; 10 January 1926 – 21 September 2018) was a Russian essayist, translator and philosopher. She was an awardee of the Bjørnson Prize of the Norwegian Academy of Literature and Freedom of Expression for "extensive contribution to strengthening the freedom of expression in Russia."

== Life ==
Zinaida Mirkina was born on 10 January 1926 in Moscow. Her parents were Alexander Mirkin, an engineer, and Alexandra Mirkina, an economist. Her grandfather, Aaron Mirkin, had been a watchmaker in Saint Petersburg. Her family was Jewish.

Mirkina attended the philological department of Moscow University from 1943 to 1948. She wrote her thesis but was unable to write the state examinations on account of a debilitating illness that made her bedridden for five years and left her partially blind. Though she had grown up in an ardent Communist family, she experienced a spiritual split between the historical optimism of Bolshevism and an understanding of life's essential tragedy.

Mirkina was married to the philosopher Grigory Pomerants. She died in Moscow on 21 September 2018.

== Career ==
From the middle of the 1950s, Mirkina began her career as a translator. She translated Sufi poetry (which was first published in 1975 in the volume Arab poetry of the middle ages in the series Library of World Literature), as well as works by Rabindranath Tagore and Rainer Maria Rilke (in particular, his Sonnets to Orpheus).

Mirkina's literary work stemmed from her experiences of suffering, her poetry becoming her call to God. Informed by her Jewishness, she combined the Christian view that the Jews were responsible for the death of Jesus, thus facing the consequences of that action. She glorified God to her own abnegation and saw every recurrence of her illness as a cycle of death and survival. Her poetry expanded beyond Christian ethics to a universal sentiment of faith which people could absorb regardless of their religion.

In the 1990s, she began to publish her own works extensively. A collection of poetry Loss of losses came out in 1991, followed by Fire and Ashes (essays on Marina Tsvetaeva, 1993) and Truth and its twins (essays on Fyodor Dostoevsky and Alexander Pushkin, 1993). With her husband, she published Great religions of the world in 1995.

In 1988, she joined In your name, a union of spiritual poets.

The Norwegian Academy of Literature and Freedom of Expression awarded Mirkina and Pomerants the Bjørnson Prize in 2009.

== Selected works ==
=== Essays and monographs ===
- Миркина, Зинаида (2012). Избранные эссе. Пушкин, Достоевский, Цветаева [Collected essays: Pushkin, Dostoevsky, Tsvetaeva]. Центр современной литературы. ISBN 978-5-91627-085-3.

=== Translations ===
- Rainer Maria Rilke (2017). Сонеты к Орфею [Sonnets to Orpheus]. Centr Gumanitarnych Iniciativ. ISBN 978-5-98712-755-1.

=== Poetry ===
- Mirkina, Zinaida (2016). Потеря потери. T︠S︡entr gumanitarnykh init︠s︡iativ. ISBN 978-5-98712-667-7.
- Миркина, Зинаида (2016). Зерно покоя. Universitetskai︠a︡ kniga. ISBN 978-5-98712-720-9.
