= Sergey Neklyudov =

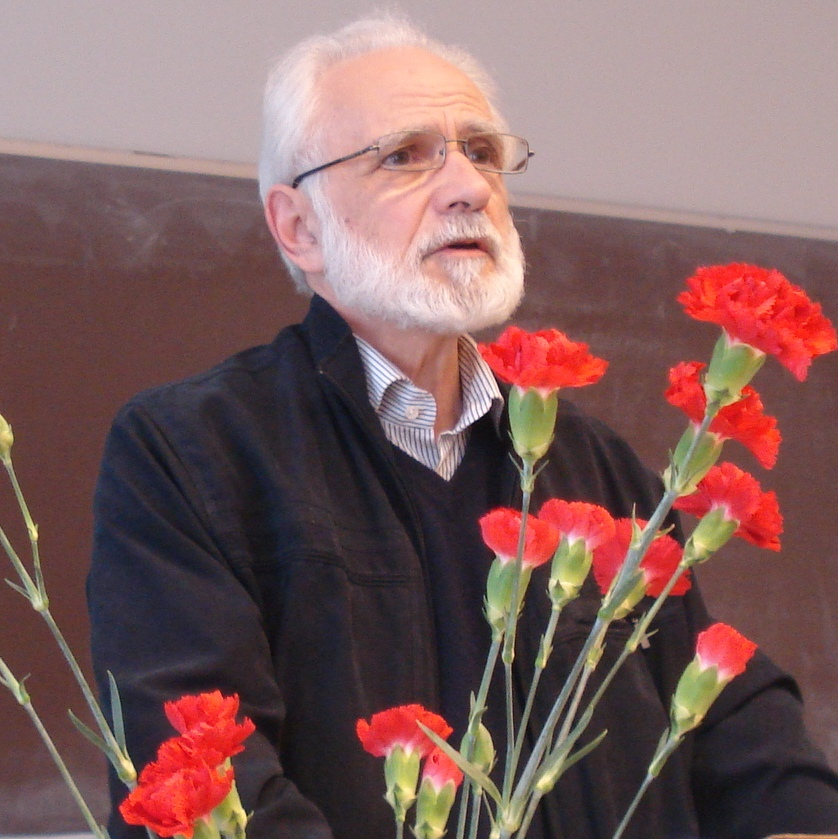
Sergey Neklyudov (Tartu, 2012)

Sergey Yurievich Neklyudov (Russian: Сергей Юрьевич Неклюдов; US. Libr. of Congress transliteration: Sergei Iur'evich Nekliudov) (born March 31, 1941) is a Soviet and Russian philosopher, folklorist and orientalist. As of 2023, he is professor and scientific director of the Center for Typology and Semiotics of Folklore at the Russian State University for the Humanities.

In 1965 he graduated from the department of philology, Moscow State University and in 1973 earned his Candidate of Sciences (Ph.D.) degree with the thesis "Epic traditions of the peoples of Central Asia and the problem of literary contacts between East and West in the Middle Ages". In 1985/1986 he earned the degree of Doctor of Sciences.

He is an author of over 500 articles, translated in many languages. His research interests include:

- theoretical folkloristics, with emphasis on functional-semantic study of oral narrative forms
- persistent themes and motifs in world literature
- folklore of the Mongolian peoples
- Russian epics and fairy tales
- Modern urban folklore, urban songs

He was a visiting professor in Canada, Germany, Ukraine, Brasil, Estonia, and Poland.

== Books ==
- 1982: (with Ж. Тумурцерен [Zhogdovzhavyn Tumurtseren, Tomortseren]): Монгольские сказания о Гесере. Новые записи. (Mongolian Epics about Gesar. New Records), Moscow, Наука, 1982. German translation (Mongolische Erzahlungen uber Geser : neue Aufzeichnungen): Wiesbaden, 1985
- 1984: Героический эпос монгольских народов. Устные и литературные традиции. Moscow, Наука, Chinese translation: Hohhot, 1991
- 2001: (among editors and authors) Структура волшебной сказки (The Structure of the Magic Fairy Tale), Moscow
  - Initially published in proceedings of Tartu workshop on semiotics (the obsuscated name "secondary modeling systems" was used for the workshop due to suppressed research in the Soviet Union) 1961–1971, translated into English (1971), German (1986), French (1992) and Italian (1977), first printed as a monograph by Russian State University for the Humanities in 2001
- 2010: Историческая поэтика фольклора: от архаики к классике

2019: Фольклорный ландшафт Монголии, vol.1: Миф и обряд, vol. 2: Эпос книжный и устный

== Awards ==
- 1972: Pitrè Prize for work on folklore
- 2022: Order of the Polar Star (Mongolia)
