= Pitrè Prize =

- Country: Italy
- Presented by: Centro Internazionale Di Etnostoria in partnership; University of Palermo; city of Palermo
- First award: 1958

The Giuseppe Pitrè – Salvatore Salomone Marino International Prize for Ethnohistory (Italian: Premio Internazionale di Etnostoria Giuseppe Pitrè -Salvatore Salomone Marino) is awarded since 1958 for an outstanding book or long essay on demoethnoanthropological issues. The prize is one of the oldest and most distinguished awards granted in the field of Cultural anthropology and Ethnohistory. It is named in honour of Giuseppe Pitrè.

== Overview ==
The prize is named after Italian folklorists Giuseppe Pitrè and Salvatore Salomone Marino. It is awarded annually by the Centro Internazionale Di Etnostoria in partnership with the University of Palermo and the city of Palermo.

== Past winners ==
- Maja Bošković-Stulli
- Juha Pentikäinen
- Anna Birgitta Rooth
- Philip Carl Salzman
- Sergey Neklyudov (1972)
