= Bogatyr Neznay =

Bashkir folktale about a boy and his magic horse

Bogatyr Neznay (Russian: Богатырь Незнай) is a folktale collected from a Bashkir source by ethnographer Aleksandr G. Bassonov. It deals with a friendship between a merchant's son and a magic horse that are forced to flee for their lives due to the boy's own mother, and reach another kingdom, where the boy adopts another identity by only uttering the words "Ne znayu" ("I don't know").

Tales where the hero is instructed by his horse to always utter "I don't know" (or a variation thereof) are reported particularly in Russia, in Finland, in the Baltic Countries and in Hungary. In the international Aarne-Thompson-Uther Index, it has been subsumed under new type ATU 314, "Goldener", with an alternate introductory episode: evil stepmother or mother persecutes hero and his horse.

== Source ==
The tale was originally collected by ethnographer Aleksandr G. Bassonov between the years of 1891 and 1906.

== Summary ==
In this tale, a rich merchant has a wife who gives birth to a son. In a matter of days, the boy grows up to be a strong bogatyr. One day, his father gives him money to buy a horse. The boy buys a one-year foal which his father believes will make a fine horse. At the same time, the merchant's wife begins an affair with a young man. Her lover advises her to kill the son: first, she sends him to the public bathhouse and douses the seam of a shirt in poison for him to put on and die. The foal warns the youth about the danger and suggests he places the poisoned shirt on a dog. It happens thus, and the dog dies. Next, the woman gives him pancakes ("блины", in the Russian translation) laced with poison, but the foal warns about the second danger and advises the youth to give the poisoned food to another dog, which eats it and dies. Failing both times, the woman's lover advises her to seek an old woman sorceress. The old sorceress advises the woman to feign illness and ask for her son's foal to be sacrificed so she can eat its meat to regain her health. The woman tells her son about it and the merchant agrees to sacrifice the horse to help his wife. The youth asks his father for a ride on the foal while he goes to gather the people. The youth seizes the opportunity to gallop away from home. The foal asks the boy to whip its flank, and the horse flies away through the air to another kingdom. The horse lands and the youth dismisses him. The local king sights the boy and inquires him about his origins, but the boy can only answer "Neznay". The king asks his viziers to bring the boy in, whom he believes will become a fine warrior, and the boy is brought before him. Again, he utters only Neznay, and is ordered to work in the garden. The boy sleeps in the garden with his head uncovered, showing a golden forelock on his head, and the local king's youngest princess falls in love with him. The cadette princess then talks to her elder sisters about marrying and they send a letter to their father, the king. The monarch agrees to marry them off and gathers a crowd of suitors, then gives apples to his daughters, for them to throw it at their husbands of choice. The eldest princess throws her to a senator, the middle to a vizier, but the cadette withholds hers. The king sends for any other available male and the soldiers bring in the gardener Neznay. The third princess throws her apple to Neznay, but the crowd thinks she made a mistake and she repeats her action, choosing Neznay. The king announces his cadette is to be given to Neznay and moved out to a chicken coop, while he marries the elder two in grand ceremonies.

Sometime later, war breaks out, and the princesses and their respective husbands go to war to protect the kingdom. The youngest princess asks her husband to join the family in the war, but he only replies with Neznay, so she requests her father for a fine horse, but is given a cart to ride. While his wife is away, he plucks a hair from his head, burns it and summons his horse, Neznay. The youth rides the horse and goes to join the others. He meets his wife en route, who does not recognize him, and asks her for a kiss, then for her silver wedding ring and headscarf, but the princess rejects his requests since he is a stranger. Neznay then meets his elder brother-in-law in the battlefield, and agrees to help him in exchange for branding a hammer-shaped tamga on his back. The eldest son-in-law agrees to the stranger's terms, suffers the branding of the tamga and returns to the king's castle to boast about his false victory, while Neznay defeats part of the enemy army. He meets his middle brother-in-law and makes the same proposition, this time asking to cut a stripe of flesh from his back in exchange for defeating his enemies. It happens thus, and Neznay defeats the army, then goes back home to the chicken shed, dismisses the horse, and lies with his wife in bed.

The queen goes to bring some food to Neznay and her daughter in their shed. She enters the shed, and finds Neznay's sword swaying in the wall and humming a sound, and a forelock of gold on the youth's head. Afraid, the queen goes back to the castle and reports to her husband about what she saw, realizing Neznay is no ordinary person due to the magic sword and his golden forelock, and fears that he may destroy the realm. The king sends a servant to inform the couple to visit him in the castle, and Neznay agrees to a visit: he dons a sapphire garment and a diamond sword, while his wife wears golden clothes. The king sees the couple in splendid clothes and, in fear, asks his viziers to spread carpets and pillows on the path for them. The monarch welcomes them and asks Neznay for forgiveness for mistrating him, since he did not know him at first. Neznay says he is not angry and respects the king as his father-in-law, so he asks him to gather his army, since Neznay is after his two runaway slaves, one with a tamga marking and another with a stripe of flesh cut off from his back. The king summons the army, but Neznay cannot find his slaves there, so he asks for the sons-in-law to be brought to his presence. The duo appears and Neznay asks the elder son-in-law to remove his clothes and show the tamga on his back, and the other to show his stripe of flesh from his back. Neznay points them as his slaves and reveals he was the one to defeat the enemy army, not them. The king tells Neznay he will give him the kingdom and bids him judge the brothers-in-law as he sees fit. Neznay declines the offer and tells the king to judge them: the king orders them to be hanged. The monarch then reigns alongside Neznay.

== Analysis ==
=== Tale type ===
According to Russian folklorist Lev Barag, the tale is the oldest attestion of the type "Neznay" (AT 532 + AT 530A) in the Bashkir tale corpus.

==== AaTh 532: I Don't Know (The Helpful Horse) ====
In type AaTh 532: I Don't Know (The Helpful Horse), of the international Aarne-Thompson Index (henceforth, AaTh or AT), the hero is persecuted by his stepmother, who also sets her sights on the hero's helpful horse, but they escape from home and go to another kingdom, where the hero is instructed to always utter "I don't know"; the hero, under a new identity, performs heroic deeds like rescuing a princess from a dragon. However, folklorist Stith Thompson, in his work The Folktale, doubted the existence of the story as an independent tale type, since, barring a different introduction, its main narrative becomes "the same as in the Goldener tale [tale type 314]". This prompted him to suppose the tale type was a "variety" of "Goldener".

A similar notion is shared by Greek folklorists Anna Angelopoulou, Marianthi Kapanoglou and Emmanuela Katrinaki, editors of the Greek Folktale Catalogue: although they classified the Greek variants under type 532 (Greek: Ο Μπιλμέμ), they still recognized that they should be indexed as type 314 (Greek: Ο Κασίδης), since their only difference seems to lie in the introductory episodes. The Hungarian Folktale Catalogue (MNK) also took notice of the great similarity between types 532 and 314, which difficulted a specific classification into one or the other.

Furthermore, German folklorist Hans-Jörg Uther, in his 2004 revision of the international tale type index (henceforth, ATU), subsumed type AaTh 532 under a new tale type, ATU 314, "Goldener", due to "its similar structure and content".

===== Introductory episodes =====
Scholarship notes three different opening episodes to the tale type: (1) the hero becomes a magician's servant and is forbidden to open a certain door, but he does and dips his hair in a pool of gold; (2) the hero is persecuted by his stepmother, but his loyal horse warns him and later they both flee; (3) the hero is given to the magician as payment for the magician's help with his parents' infertility problem. Folklorist Christine Goldberg, in Enzyklopädie des Märchens, related the second opening to former tale type AaTh 532, "The Helpful Horse (I Don't Know)", wherein the hero is persecuted by his stepmother and flees from home with his horse. (Note: According to Stith Thompson's 1961 revision of the index, in type 532 the hero's helpful horse advises him to answer every question with the sentence "I don't know".)

American folklorist Barre Toelken recognized the spread of the tale type across Northern, Eastern and Southern Europe, but identified three subtypes: one that appears in Europe (Subtype 1), wherein the protagonist becomes the servant to a magical person, finds the talking horse and discovers his benefactor's true evil nature, and acquires a golden colour on some part of his body; a second narrative (Subtype 3), found in Greece, Turkey, Caucasus, Uzbekistan and Northern India, where the protagonist is born through the use of a magical fruit; and a third one (Subtype 2). According to Toelken, this Subtype 2 is "the oldest", being found "in Southern Siberia, Iran, the Arabian countries, Mediterranean, Hungary and Poland". In this subtype, the hero (who may be a prince) and the foal are born at the same time and become friends, but their lives are at stake when the hero's mother asks for the horse's vital organ (or tries to kill the boy to hide her affair), which motivates their flight from their homeland to another kingdom.

==== ATU 530A: The Pig with the Golden Bristles ====
In type 530A, The Pig with the Golden Bristles, the king sends his sons-in-law to hunt or capture marvellous animals, like a pig with golden-bristles; the lowly hero, pretending to be a fool, is the one to do it, and tricks his brothers-in-law into giving parts of their bodies, like fingertips or cut off flesh, then unmasks their deceit at a feast with the king.

According to German folklorist Hans-Jörg Uther, in the 2004 revision of the international index, tale type ATU 530A can appear in combination with type ATU 314, Goldener.

=== Motifs ===
According to folklorist Christine Goldberg, in Enzyklopädie des Märchens, the "only specific motif" of type 532 is the hero's feigned ignorance on the horse's orders.

Professor Anna Birgitta Rooth stated that the motif of the stepmother's persecution of the hero appears in tale type 314 in variants from Slavonic, Eastern European and Near Eastern regions. She also connected this motif to part of the Cinderella cycle, in a variation involving a male hero and his cow.

==== The suitor selection test ====
In Iranian tales about the sea-horse, the princess throws an apple to her suitor - a motif indexed as motif H316, "Suitor test: apple thrown indicates princess' choice (often golden apple)". According to mythologist Yuri Berezkin and other Russian researchers, the motif is "popular" in Iran, and is also attested "in Central Europe, the Balkans, the Caucasus, the Near East, and Central Asia".

According to Turkologist Karl Reichl, types ATU 314 and ATU 502 contain this motif: the princess chooses her own husband (of lowly appearance) in a gathering of potential suitors, by giving him an object (e.g., an apple). However, he also remarks that the motif is "spread in folk literature" and may appear in other tale types.

Germanist Günter Dammann, in Enzyklopädie des Märchens, argued that Subtype 2 (see above) represented the oldest form of the Goldener narrative, since the golden apple motif in the suitor selection roughly appears in the geographic distribution of the same subtype.

==== Branding the brothers-in-law ====
According to German scholars Günther Damman and Kurt Ranke, another motif that appears in tale type ATU 314 is the hero branding his brothers-in-law during their hunt. Likewise, Ranke stated that the hero's branding represented a mark of his ownership over his brothers-in-law.

Ranke located the motif in the Orient and in the Mediterranean. In the same vein, Hungarian professor Ákos Dömötör, in the notes to tale type ATU 314 in the Hungarian National Catalogue of Folktales (MNK), remarked that the motif was a "reflection of the Eastern legal custom", which also appears in the Turkic epic Alpamysh.

== Variants ==
According to Lev Barag, tale type Neznaiko (AT 532) (Note: Neznaiko is the name given to type 532 in the East Slavic Folktale Classification (Russian: СУС, romanized: SUS), where it is termed SUS 532, Russian: Незнайка, romanized: Neznaika, lit. 'I Don't Know': a hero is banished with his horse by his stepmother and, to protect himself, he is advised by the horse to always say "не знаю" (Russian for "I do not know"); the hero finds work as a gardener to another king, and, through heroic deeds, marries a princess.) is widespread among the Bashkirs, (Note: Tatar scholarship locates 14 variants of the tale among Turkic peoples in Russia: five Tatar texts, three Bashkir texts, and one Chuvash text, along with two stories from Novosibirsk Oblast, two from Ulyanovsk Oblast, and a single one from Nizhny Novgorod Oblast.) and "many of its variants" are contaminated with the plot or individual motifs of type 530A, The Pig With Golden Bristles. Per Barag, "all" Bashkir variants follow the narrative of the Russian variants, wherein the hero is a merchant's son, instead of being born along with his helpful horse via an apple given to his mother - a motif that appears in Turkish tales.

Stith Thompson supposed that tale type 532 was "essentially a Russian development", with variants also found in Hungary, Finland and the Baltic Countries. In the same vein, Hungarian-American scholar Linda Dégh stated that the type was "particularly widespread" in the Central and Eastern regions of Europe.

=== Neznay ===
In a tale from the Bashkirs titled "Незнай" ("Don't-Know"), a merchant and his wife have a son. On the same day, a foal, a puppy and a kitten are born. Years later, when the merchant is away, the woman begins to have an affair with the boy's teacher from the madrashah, Khalfa. The man convinces her to get rid of the boy to keep the affair a secret: first, they try to poison his soup; next, they try to poison a piece of bread. However, the boy is warned of the danger by his horse. The khalfa then convinces the merchant's wife to feign illness and call for him. The khalfa, pretending to be a doctor, tells the merchant his wife needs meat from the horse and his son's thigh. Despite the cruelty of the remedy, the merchant decides to go through with it. The next day, the horse advises the boy to ask for one last ride on it. On the hour of execution, the boy does as the horse instructed, mounts on the horse and flees from home, the dog and cat behind them. After riding for a year, they stop to rest by a mountain, where the horse points to a stone nearby, and tells the merchant's son there is a sword and a mighty armor underneath it. The horse tells the boy to enter its ear and come out the other, and he will be able to lift the stone. After a while, the horse tells they must part, but the boy just has to whistle to summon him, and instructs him to always answer "Neznay" and play with a ball. The boy rolls a ball and arrives at the city, where the three princesses take notice of his beauty and fight over him, but he can only answer "Neznay". Some time later, the king sets his elder daughter's marriage, but a three-headed deva threatens to take the elder princess by force. The king gathers his troops to defend his daughter and fight against the three-headed deva's army. Neznay summons his horse, rides into the battlefield and kills the deva with the sword, then rushes back to his position. His elder daughter safe, he marries her to the vizier. The nest time, the king tries to marry his middle daughter to another vizier, but the six-headed deva threatens to take her. Just like the first time, Neznay summons the horse, rides into battle to defeat the deva, but is injured in the hand. The princess wraps a kerchief around his hand, and he gallops back to his place. The third time, the youngest princess chooses Neznay as her husband. Despite his reservations, the king consents to the marriage between simple Neznay and his daughter, but a twelve-headed deva threatens the kingdom. Neznay summons the horse and rides into battle to defeat the twelve-headed deva. After a fierce fight, he is victorious, but is conce again injured. The princess wraps his wound and returns to his hut to rest. The king's army goes back to the city and the princess looks for Neznay in the usual place, but does not find him, so she goes to his hut and finds him still wearing the armor. He wakes up and embraces her, and they marry. Some time later, his brothers-in-law try to get rid of Neznay by sending him on quests for outlandish items, such as a magic tablecloth guarded by an azhdaha. Neznay rides before them and shapeshifts into a fisherman. The brothers-in-law arrive later and the fisherman, asking him for the tablecloth. The fisherman (Neznay) promises to get them the tablecloth, in exchange for one brother-in-law cutting off a finger, and the other cutting off a slice of flesh from his back. With the help of his horse, Neznay gets the object and delivers it to his brothers-in-law, disguised as the fisherman, so they pay up the deal. The brothers-in-law then bring the tablecloth to the king and take the credit for the deed, but Neznay appears soon after and points to their attire: a glove hiding the missing finger, and a heavy shirt covering an injured back. Lev Barag suggested that the non-magical elements in the tale (e.g., the vizier, the halfa or teacher, and the hero's mother's lover) were indicative of the "oriental character" of the tale.

=== Neznayka (Bilmiyorum) ===
In a Bashkir tale translated to Turkish as Neznayka (Bilmiyorum) ("I Don't Know"), a couple have a son they do not know how to name, so they confer with a mullah, who also does not know ("Bilmiyorum") either. Thus, he calls the boy "Bilmiyorum" and leaves. The couple does not agree to their son's name, and consult with a priest, who asks them how they should name the boy. The priest replies in Russian: "Neznay", thus the boy changes his name from Bashkir "Bilmeyin" to Russian "Neznayka". Neznayka grows up, but his mother dies and his father remarries. One day, Neznayka asks his father to buy him a horse. The boy's father buys him a lame-looking foal they bring home and place at the stables. The foal becomes a fine stallion with time. One day, Neznayka's stepmother becomes ill and asks for the horse to be sacrificed and given to her. The horse talks to Neznayka about it, and tells him to jump at its neck when the mullah comes to check on his stepmother. The next day, the mullah confers with the woman and she says she wants the horse's meat as remedy, so the horse is ready to be put down. Neznayka's father goes to cut the horse's neck with a knife, but the boy, in tears, jumps onto the horse's neck to stop the deed. Neznayka then licks some of the horse's blood and transforms into a fine knight with fine garments and a whip in hand, and so does the animal, with golden bridle and silver saddle. Neznayka then jumps onto the horse's back, says goodbye to his father and gallops away to another land. The boy lands at a crossroads, takes three hairs from his horse's tail and three from its tail, then buys some shabby garments from a shepherd. He finally reaches another city and sleeps next to the gates of the sultan's palace. He is found out by the sultan and can only answer "Neznayka". The sultan's three daughters each come to see the stranger: he replies "Neznayka" to the first two, but shows his fine garments to the youngest, who falls in love with him. Later, the sultan organizes a ceremony to marry his youngest, since the elder two are already married, respectively, to Karağoş and Karağol: he gathers a crowd, and the princess is to hit a ball and, whoever catches it, shall marry her. She hits it and no one catches it. The people then say Neznayka is not there with them, so he is brought to the assemblage. The princess throws the ball three times and it falls on Neznayka's head, to the sultan's concern. He agrees to marry his daughter to the poor youth, but gives them shabby accommodations. Some time later, the kingdom is menaced by three multiheaded "peris": a three-headed one, then a six-headed one, and lastly a twelve-headed one. For the first two, the sultan sends his sons-in-law Karağoş and Karağol (Карагуш and Карагул) to fight it. Neznayka wishes to join the fight, and is given a lame mount: a goat. When he is out of sight, Neznayka kills the goat and tosses it to the crows, then summons his horse by burning its hairs, goes to fight the peri and returns to his lame disguise. On the third time, the sultan says he will join Neznayka, since the latter lost his mount twice before. This time, Neznayka also kills his mount out of the sultan's view, dons the fine garments and goes to fight the twelve-headed peri. The fight is a difficult one, for the peri strikes Neznayka's wrist. The sultan address the knight's wound with his handkerchief, and the knight leaves. The sultan invites everyone to a grand feast to honor Karağoş and Karağol, and places Neznayka in a corner. The youth, however, begins to look pale and they check on him: he is losing blood due to the injury he suffered in the fight against the third peri. The sultan also notices his own handkerchief on Neznayka's body, and realizes he was the true saviour, not his other sons-in-law. The monarch punishes Karağoş and Karağol and Neznayka becomes sultan after him.

== See also ==
- Neznaiko
- Green-Vanka
- The Son of the Padishah and the Horse
