= Grigory Pomerants =

Lithuanian-born Russian philosopher and cultural theorist

Grigory Solomonovich Pomerants
- Григорий Соломонович Померанц
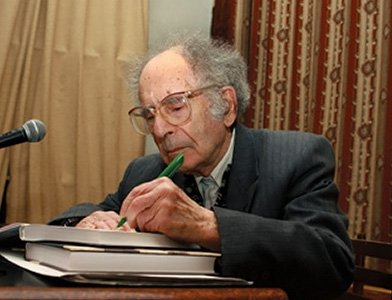
- Pomerants at a talk in 2009
- Born: 13 March 1918; Vilnius, Lithuania
- Died: 16 February 2013 (aged 94); Moscow, Russia
- Spouse: Zinaida Mirkina
- Awards: Order of the Patriotic War, Order of the Red Star, the Bjørnson Prize of the Norwegian Academy of Literature and Freedom of Expression

Education
- Education: Moscow State University (1940)

Philosophical work
- Institutions: Tula Pedagogical Institute; Institute of Philosophy in Moscow; the Library of Public Sciences of the Russian Academy of Sciences
- Main interests: philosophy, culturology, essays
- Website: pomeranz.ru

Grigory Solomonovich Pomerants (also: Grigorii or Grigori, Russian: Григо́рий Соломо́нович Помера́нц, 13 March 1918, Vilnius – 16 February 2013, Moscow) was a Russian philosopher and cultural theorist. He is the author of numerous philosophical works that circulated in samizdat and made an impact on the liberal intelligentsia in the 1960s and 1970s.

== Early life ==
Grigory Pomerants was born in 1918 to a Polish Jewish family in Vilnius, Lithuania. His family moved to Moscow in 1925. Pomerants graduated in Russian language and literature from the Moscow Institute of Philosophy, Literature and History (IFLI, MIFLI). His thesis on Fyodor Dostoyevsky was condemned as "anti-Marxist" and as a result he was barred from admission to post-graduate studies in 1939. He went on to lecture at the Tula Pedagogical Institute in 1940.

During the Second World War, Pomerants volunteered to the front, where he fought as a Red Army infantryman. He was wounded in the leg, as a result of which he was assigned as a writer to the editorial office of the divisional newspaper. He was awarded the Order of the Red Star.

In 1946, he was expelled from the Communist Party for "anti-Party statements". Three years later he was arrested and sentenced to five years' imprisonment for anti-Soviet agitation. After Joseph Stalin's death in 1953, he was released due to a general amnesty. He did not rejoin the Party, which prohibited him from teaching at tertiary level. He was also denied Moscow residence. From 1953 to 1956, Pomerants worked as a village school teacher in the Donets Basin and later, upon his return to Moscow, as a bibliographer in the Fundamental Library of Social Sciences of the Russian Academy of Sciences.

== Dissident activities ==
Under the impression of the Hungarian Revolution of 1956 and the persecution of Boris Pasternak, Pomerants became active as a dissident. In 1959–1960, he led semi-secret seminars on philosophical, historical, political and economic issues. During this time he established contact with dissidents such as Vladimir Osipov and the editors and contributors of the dissident magazine Sintaksis Alexander Ginzburg, Natalya Gorbanevskaya and Yuri Galanskov. He also became close to the painters of the underground Lianozovo group.

On December 3, 1965, Pomerants gave a lecture at the Institute of Philosophy in Moscow publicly denouncing Stalinism. It caused a sensation and became one of the early pieces of samizdat literature. In 1968, he co-signed a petition in support of the participants of the 1968 Red Square demonstration against the introduction of Soviet troops into Czechoslovakia. He also put his signature to Larisa Bogoraz and Pavel Litvinov's "Appeal to the World Public Opinion" in protest of Trial of the Four. As a result, he was deprived of any opportunity to defend his thesis on Zen Buddhism at the Moscow Institute of Oriental Studies.

In addition to official articles, which focused on the spiritual traditions of India and China, Pomerants began to write essays on historical and social topics. While his works were soon stopped from being printed in the Soviet Union, they were widely published in samizdat. They were also reprinted in the western émigré magazines Kontinent, Sintaksis and Strana i Mir, and a collection of essays under the title Neopublikovannoe (Unpublished Works) was published in 1972 in Frankfurt.

Pomerants' political and social articles as well as his public conduct attracted the attention of the KGB. On November 14, 1984, Pomerants was officially warned in connection with his publications abroad. On May 26, 1985, KGB agents searched his flat and confiscated his literary archive.

== Philosophical positions ==
Andrei Sakharov, who had met Pomerants in an informal seminar at Valentin Turchin's flat in 1970, describes his interests as follows:

The most stimulating speaker at Turchin's seminar was Grigory Pomerants, a former political prisoner and a specialist in Oriental philosophy. I was astounded by his erudition, his broad perspective, his sardonic humor, and his academic approach (in the best sense of that term). Pomerants's three of four talks paid homage to the civilization created by the interaction of all nations, East and West, over the course of millennia. He praised tolerance and compromise, deploring (as I do) the poverty and sterility of narrow chauvinism, dictatorships, and totalitarian regimes. Pomerants is a man of rare independence, integrity, and intensity who has not let material poverty cramp his rich, if underrated, contribution to our intellectual life.

— Andrei Sakharov, Memoirs

Pomerants was among the first Russian disciples of cultural and literary theorist Mikhail Bakhtin.

For many years, Pomerants was involved in polemics with Alexander Solzhenitsyn. Pomerants strongly criticized what he saw as Solzhenitsyn's dogmatic Christian nationalism and positioned himself closer to the liberal, internationalist wing of the intelligentsia. He countered Solzhenitsyn's notion of "evil" as an unavoidably global, well-established phenomenon, associated with Communism, by citing Eastern traditions which reject the notion of an inherently permanent, ontological evil.

Pomerants himself stated that he preferred to be called a "thinker" (myslitel') rather than a "philosopher", since this term does not imply the academic discipline of philosophy, which he felt was merely neighboring his own work (po sosedstvu).

One of the most quoted pieces in Russian by Pomerants reflected his views on the nature of social debate:

The devil is born from an angel spitting in rage… People and systems crumble to dust, but the spirit of hate, bred by the champions of good, is immortal and thus evil on Earth knows no end. In the debates of the 1970s I stubbornly went against all my instincts and impulses to spit in rage, and in this struggle, I found another truth – the manner of the debate is more important that the object of the debate. Objects come and go, while manners form the building blocks of civilizations.

— Grigory Pomerants, Dogma of Debate

== Other ==
Pomerants' lectures and a rejected thesis on Zen Buddhism were studied by filmmaker Andrei Tarkovsky and composer Eduard Artemyev during their work on Stalker. Pomerants also appears in the 2008 documentary Meeting Andrei Tarkovsky.

In 2009, The Bjørnson Prize of the Norwegian Academy of Literature and Freedom of Expression was awarded to Pomerants and Mirkina "for their extensive contribution to strengthening the freedom of expression in Russia."

Pomerants was married to Russian poet Zinaida Mirkina. He died, aged 94, in Moscow, Russia.

== Major works ==
Books

- (in Russian) Померанц, Григорий. Открытость бездне [Openness to the Abyss]. М.: Советский писатель, 1990 г., ISBN 5-265-01527-2
- (in Russian) Померанц, Григорий. Выход из транса [Exit from Trance]. Юрист., 1995 г., OCLC 646577510
- (in Russian) Миркина, Зинаида; Померанц, Григорий. Великие религии мира [The Major World Religions] М.: Рипол., 1995 г., ISBN 5-87907-016-6
- (in Russian) Померанц, Григорий. Записки гадкого утенка [Notes of an Ugly Duckling], М.: Московский рабочий, (1995) 2003, ISBN 5-8243-0430-0
- Pomerants, Grigory. The spiritual movement from the West. An Essay and Two Talks, Caux: Caux Books, 2004, ISBN 2-88037-600-9

Articles

- Pomerants, Grigory; Koriakov, Alexis (July 1971). "Man without an adjective". The Russian Review. 30 (3): 219–225. doi:10.2307/128130. JSTOR 128130.
- Pomerants, Grigorii (July–September 1989). "The liberal democratic world order and the traditions of 'suboecumenae'". International Journal on World Peace. 6 (3): 45–55. JSTOR 20751377.
- Pomerants, Grigorii (June 1990). "Armageddon, perestroika, and utopia". International Journal on World Peace. 7 (2): 76–81. JSTOR 20751453.
- Pomerants, Grigorii (September 1991). "The assassination unnoticed by the West". International Journal on World Peace. 8 (3): 55–58. JSTOR 20751709.
- Pomerants, Grigorii (July 1993). "The irrational in politics". Russian Studies in Philosophy. 32 (1): 6–15. doi:10.2753/RSP1061-196732016.
- Pomerants, Grigorii (July 1997). "After postmodernism, or the art of the twenty-first century". Russian Studies in Literature. 33 (3): 86–94. doi:10.2753/RSL1061-1975330386.
- Pomerants, Grigorii (July 1998). "Without repentance". Russian Studies in Literature. 34 (3): 72–81. doi:10.2753/RSL1061-1975340372.
- Pomerants, Grigorii (October 1998). "Russian thinkers on Dostoevsky". Russian Studies in Literature. 34 (4): 19–27. doi:10.2753/RSL1061-1975340419.
