= Saugestad =

Saugestad is a Norwegian surname.

Notable people with this surname include:

- Ed Saugestad (1937–2014), American ice hockey coach
- Frode Saugestad (born 1974), Norwegian scholar
- Oluf A. Saugestad (1840–1926), Norwegian-American politician
- Stian Saugestad (born 1992), Norwegian alpine skier

== See also ==
- Saugstad
