= Kristin Solberg =

Norwegian journalist and author (born 1982)

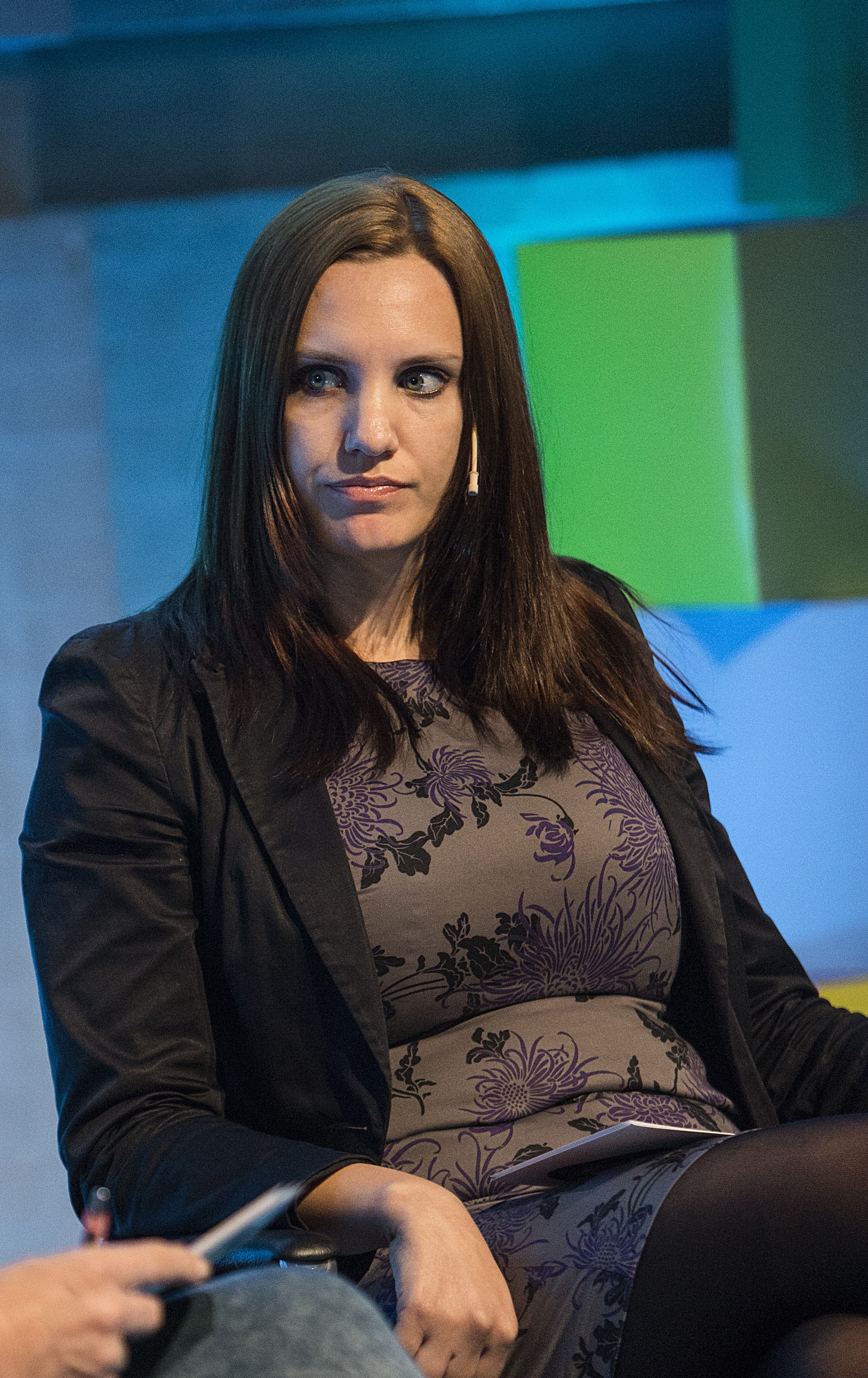
Kristin Solberg

Kristin Solberg (born 1982) is a Norwegian journalist and author. She is the Middle East correspondent for NRK and presently based in Beirut. Previously she covered the Middle East and South Asia forAftenposten.

Solberg has a bachelor's degree in journalism from Sheffield University and a master's degree in international relations from London school of Economics. She has also studied Arabic in Lebanon and worked for a newspaper there. After working temporarily for Aftenposten in Norway in 2007, she started as a freelance correspondent in New Delhi and became the South Asia correspondent for Aftenposten. She was based in Kabul from 2011 and 2013. In 2013 she became based in Cairo as a Middle East correspondent. In December 2014 she got the position of correspondent in Istanbul where she will cover West-Asia and part of the Middle East.

She has written one book about Pakistan and one about a midwife school in Afghanistan.

== Awards ==
- International Reporter Journalist Prize for Gjennom de renes land - Rapport fra Pakistan (2011)
- Den store journalistprisen, with Anders Sømme Hammer (2014)
- The Bjørnson Prize (2014)

== Bibliography ==
- Gjennom de renes land - Rapport fra Pakistan 2011 ISBN 9788203293153
- Livets skole 2013 ISBN 978-82-03-29341-2
