= Norwegian Academy of Literature and Freedom of Expression =

The Norwegian Academy of Literature and Freedom of Expression (Det Norske Akademi for Litteratur og Ytringsfrihet) is a Norwegian institution founded by the poet Knut Ødegård in 2003 and also called Bjørnstjerne Bjørnson-Akademiet. Its objective is to promote understanding of other cultures and literary free speech. The membership includes Norwegian and foreign scholars, authors, politicians, and journalists. The organization's 2016 President was Kristenn Einarsson.

== The Bjørnson Prize ==
The association annually awards the international (Bjørnsonprisen) which includes a cash award of 100,000 kroner (approximately €10,000).

Recipients of the award:

- 2004 – Vivian Fouad and Samir Morcos (Egypt), for promotion of relations between Muslims and Christians.
- 2005 – Esma Redzepova (Republic of Macedonia), for championing the Roma people (gypsies).
- 2006 – Hrant Dink, Editor-in-Chief of the Armenian bi-lingual weekly paper Agos (Istanbul).
- 2007 – Adunis (pen name for Ali Ahmad Said Asbar), Syrian poet.
- 2008 – Ola Larsmo, Swedish writer.
- 2009 – Grigory Pomerants and Zinaida Mirkina, Russian philosophers and writers.
- 2010 – Milan Richter (Slovakia) and Einar Már Guðmundsson (Iceland), writers.
- 2011 – Ola Didrik Saugstad and Marte Wexelsen Goksøyr.
- 2012 – Bishop Thomas of al-Qusiyya and Mair, Wojoud Mejalli and David Zonsheine, human rights activists from Egypt, Yemen and Israel.
- 2013 – Yaşar Kemal, Turkish author.
- 2014 – Kristin Solberg, Norwegian journalist and author.
- 2015 – Edward Snowden, whistleblower.
- 2016 – Cecilia Dinardi, Norwegian children's rights activist.
- 2017 – Bruce Springsteen
- 2018 – Johannes Anyuru, Swedish poet and author.
- 2019 – Carsten Jensen, Danish author and political columnist.
- 2020 – Maja Lunde, Norwegian writer.
- 2021 – Sara Omar, Danish-Kurdish author, human rights activist, and poet.
- 2022 – Niviaq Korneliussen, Greenlandic writer.
- 2023 – Åsne Seierstad, Norwegian freelance journalist and writer.
- 2024 – Caspar Eric, Danish poet.
- 2025 – Sofi Oksanen, Finnish writer and playwright.

The prize ceremony is held in the autumn in conjunction with the annual seminar held at the historic Bjørnson house in Molde.
