= Hızır =

Hızır is a Turkish spelling and variant of Arabic masculine given name Khidr.

Notable people with this name include:

- Kurtoğlu Hızır Reis, Ottoman admiral
- Hızır Reis, later Hayreddin Barbarossa, Ottoman admiral
- Hızır Sarı, Turkish Olympic Wrestler
- Hizir Yildiz, Turkish author
