= Per Saugstad =

Norwegian psychologist (1920–2010)

Per Saugstad (24 October 1920 – 7 November 2010) was a Norwegian psychologist. He was Professor of Psychology at the University of Oslo, and is noted for his work on visual perception, thinking, language, and the history of psychology.

== Career ==
He was born in Oslo. After getting a cand.philol. degree from the University of Oslo in 1945, he went to the United States, receiving a Ph.D. in Psychology from the University of Chicago in 1952. Back in Norway, he joined the Department of Psychology at the University of Oslo, rising to docent in 1962 and full professor in 1967. He retired in 1990. In Chicago Saugstad had become interested in experimental psychology, and his American approach to psychology was initially met with some resistance in Oslo, where the psychology department was still dominated by psychoanalysis in the 1950s.

Saugstad has done important research in several areas, such as visual perception, thinking, and language. Among his books are An inquiry into the foundations of psychology (1965), A Theory of Communication and Use of Language. Foundations for the Study of Psychology (1977), A Theory of Language and Understanding (1980), Language: A theory of its structure and use (1989). In later years, his work focused on the history of psychology, culminating in the book A History of Modern Psychology. He was a member of the Finnish Academy of Science and Letters.

He died in November 2010. He was the father of professor of pediatrics Ola Didrik Saugstad and professor of philosophy Jens Saugstad.

== Books ==
- An inquiry into the foundations of psychology (Universitetsforlaget, 1965)
- A Theory of Communication and Use of Language: Foundations for the Study of Psychology (Universitetsforlaget, 1977)
- A Theory of Language and Understanding (Universitetsforlaget/Columbia University Press, 1980)
- Language: A theory of its structure and use (Solum, 1989)
- A History of Modern Psychology (Cambridge University Press, 2018)
