= Ola Didrik Saugstad =

Norwegian pediatrician and neonatologist

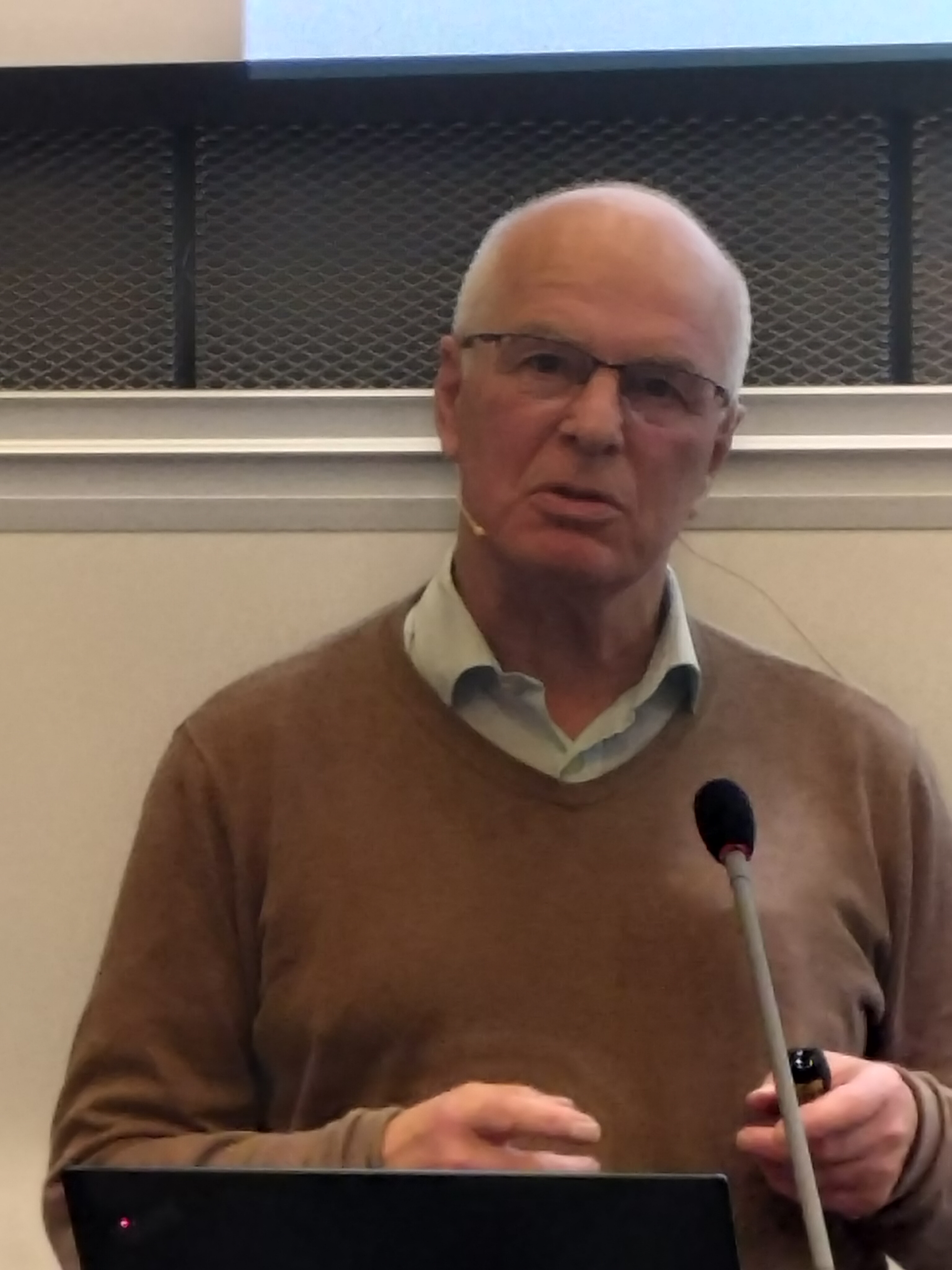
- Saugstad i 2025
- Born: 5 March 1947 (age 79)
- Education: University of Oslo
- Known for: Research on resuscitation of newborn children
- Scientific career
- Fields: Medicine (pediatrics, neonatology)
- Workplaces: University of Oslo
- Doctoral advisor: Gösta Rooth

Ola Didrik Saugstad (born 5 March 1947) is a Norwegian pediatrician, neonatologist and neuroscientist noted for his research on resuscitation of newborn children and his contribution to reduce child mortality. He is a Research Professor at Oslo University Hospital and Professor of Neonatology at Northwestern University's Feinberg School of Medicine in Chicago. He is Professor Emeritus of Pediatrics at the University of Oslo and was Director of the Department of Pediatric Research at Oslo University Hospital from 1991 to 2017.

Christian P. Speer and Henry L. Halliday described Saugstad as a "world renowned expert in neonatal medicine," particularly on hypoxia and purine metabolism, hypoxia-reoxygenation injury, the effect and mechanisms of oxygen radicals in the neonatal period, mechanisms of lung injury and newborn resuscitation. In 2010, international guidelines for newborn resuscitation were amended, based on the research of Saugstad and his colleagues, to recommend the use of air in place of pure oxygen, a discovery that is estimated to save the lives of 200,000 newborn children each year. He is an advisor to the World Health Organization on child mortality. Saugstad has been cited over 30,000 times in scientific literature. The NRK describes him as "the most internationally recognized and most widely cited Norwegian pediatrician of all times."

Saugstad received the 2012 Nordic Medical Prize, is a member of the Norwegian Academy of Science and Letters and became a Knight First Class of the Order of St. Olav in 2010. His 2019 book Kampen om oksygenet ("The War Over Oxygen") discusses what he describes as "one [of] the greatest scandals in the history of medicine;" former Prime Minister Kjell Magne Bondevik introduced the book when it was released at the House of Literature in Oslo.

== Background ==
Ola Didrik Saugstad is a son of the psychologist Per Saugstad and a grandson of the former rector of the University of Oslo Didrik Arup Seip. His father earned a PhD in psychology at the University of Chicago in 1952, before he became a professor of psychology at the University of Oslo, and was noted for introducing an experimental approach to psychology in Norway, influenced by American psychology. Ola Didrik Saugstad is the brother of Jens Saugstad, a professor of philosophy at the University of Oslo.

== Career ==
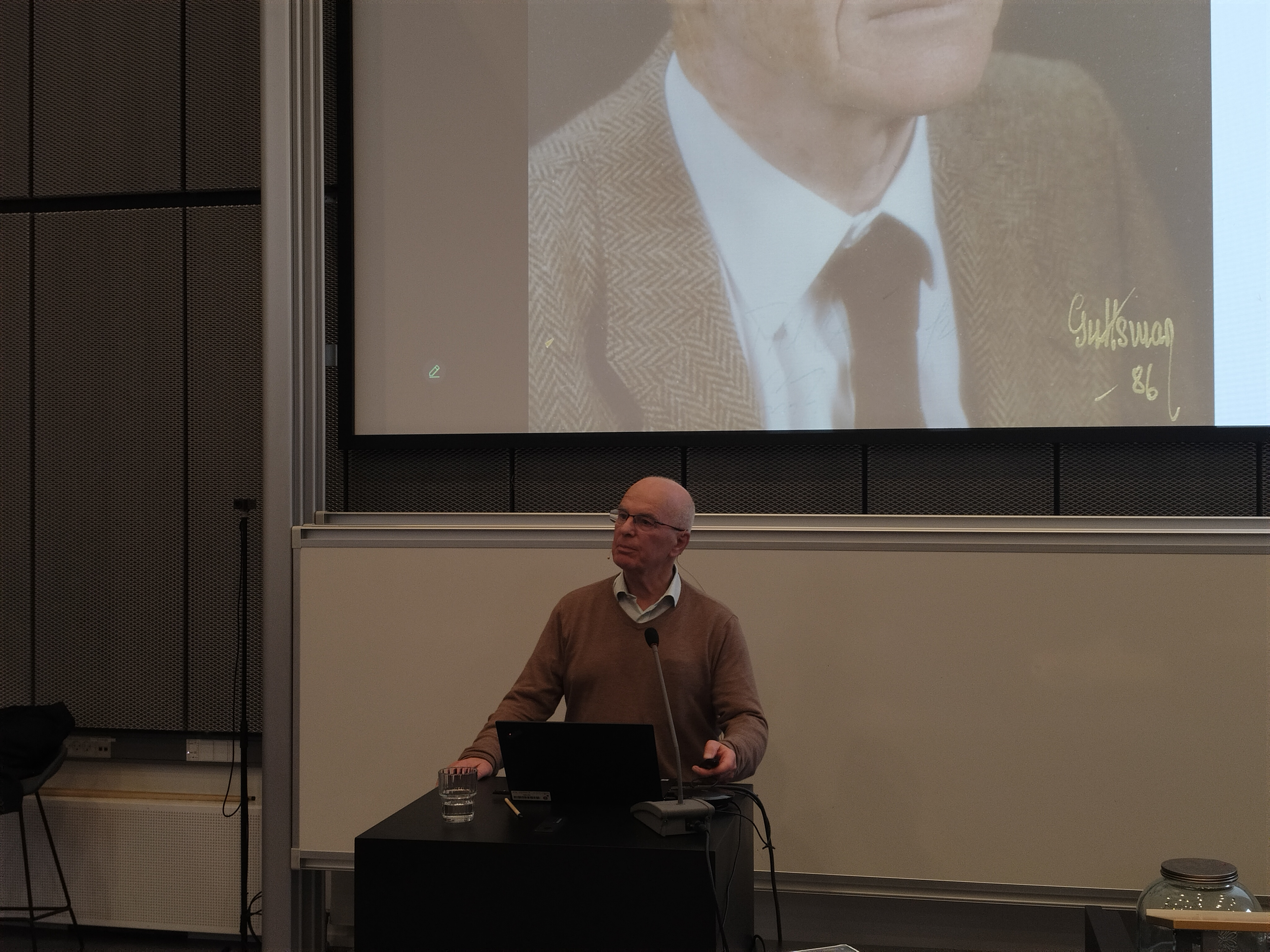
Saugstad speaking during a presentation at Copenhagen University in October 2025

He graduated with the cand. med. degree at the University of Oslo in 1973. Already as a medical student he became interested in the Swedish professor Gösta Rooth's research in the field of perinatal medicine and especially intrauterine asphyxia, and Rooth invited him to come to Sweden and do research; thus, after graduation he was a research fellow at Uppsala University Hospital. The research he carried out under Rooth's mentorship laid the foundation for his doctoral dissertation in 1977, Hypoxanthine as an Indicator of Hypoxia, and for what would become his major research interest.

From 1980 to 1981 he was a Fogarty International Fellow at the Department of Neonatology of the University of California, San Diego, in the unit of the legendary professor Louis Gluck, known as the father of neonatology.

Saugstad was appointed senior consultant in newborn medicine at Rikshospitalet in 1986. In 1991, he also became Professor of Pediatrics and Director of the Department of Pediatric Research at the University of Oslo. From 2002 to 2004 he was President of the European Association of Perinatal Medicine. He was a board member of the European Society of Pediatric Research from 1987 to 1990, and of the International Pediatric Foundation from 2001 to 2004.

Saugstad retired as Professor of Medicine and Director of the Department of Pediatric Research at the end of 2017. From 2017 he is affiliated with Oslo University Hospital as a research professor. In 2018 he was also appointed as Professor of Neonatology at the Feinberg School of Medicine in Chicago.

== Research ==
In 1980, Saugstad was the first to demonstrate that oxygenation after a period of asphyxia could result in an explosive increase in oxygen radicals. In the late 1980s, Saugstad and Rooth published a seminal article questioning the use of 100% oxygen in the resuscitation of newborn children. This would lead to his major discovery of the dangers of using 100% oxygen, resulting in the amendment of the international guidelines for newborn resuscitation in 2010 based on the research of Saugstad and his team. Saugstad has described the use of 100% oxygen as "one of the largest scandals in the history of medicine." It is estimated that his discovery can save the lives of 200,000 children each year.

He has published more than 500 articles and book chapters in journals and books. He has served as an editor or a member of the editorial boards of several journals. According to Google Scholar, his work has been cited over 30,000 times in scientific literature, and he has an h-index of 86.

His 2019 book Kampen om oksygenet ("The War Over Oxygen") discusses what he describes as "one [of] the greatest scandals in the history of medicine;" former Prime Minister Kjell Magne Bondevik introduced the book when it was released at the House of Literature in Oslo.

Saugstad is known for having taken elements of the research of 2019's Nobel laureates in medicine William Kaelin Jr., Peter J. Ratcliffe and Gregg L. Semenza to the infant's bedside.

== Awards and recognitions ==
- The Laerdal Award in Acute Medicine, 1995 (University of Oslo)
- The Arvo Ylppö Medal in Neonatology, 1997 (University of Helsinki)
- Fellow, Royal College of Physicians Edinburgh, 1997
- Honorary member of the Hungarian Paediatric Association, 2000
- Honorary member of the Norwegian Perinatal Society, 2001
- The Virginia Apgar Prize, 2001
- Honorary member of the Finnish Perinatal Society, 2005
- Honorary member of the European Association of Perinatal Medicine, 2006
- Fellow of the World Academy of Art and Science, 2006
- The Human Protection Award (Livsvernprisen) (with Torleiv Ole Rognum), 2007
- Knight First Class of the Royal Norwegian Order of St. Olav, 2010
- Märta Philipson Award for Progress in Pediatrics (University of Stockholm), 2010
- Honorary member of the American Pediatric Society 2011
- American Academy of Pediatrics Landmark Award 2011
- The Bjørnson Prize, 2011
- Nordic Medical Prize, 2012
- Member of the Norwegian Academy of Science and Letters, 2013
- Honorary doctorate, University of Athens, 2014
- Honorary Professor, Moscow State University, 2014
- Chiesi Prize of Excellence in Neonatology, 2017
- Erich Saling Perinatal Prize, 2017
