= Ignác Kúnos =

Hungarian linguist (1860–1945)

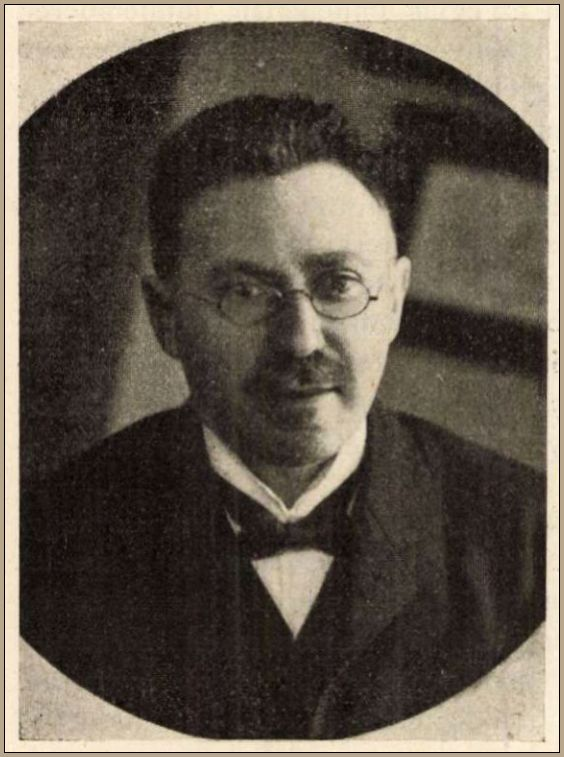
Portrait of Ignaz Kúnos, 1911

Ignác Kúnos (originally Ignác Lusztig; 22 September 1860 in Hajdúsámson, Hungary – 12 January 1945 in Budapest, Hungary) was a Hungarian linguist, turkologist, folklorist, a correspondent member of the Hungarian Academy of Sciences. At his time he was one of the most recognised scholars of the Turkish folk literature and Turkish dialectology.

Kunos attended the Reformed College in Debrecen, then studied linguistics at the Budapest University between 1879 and 1882. With the financial support of the Hungarian Academy of Sciences and the Budapest Jewish community he spent five years in Constantinople studying Turkish language and culture. In 1890 he was appointed at the Budapest University as professor of the Turkish philology. Between 1899-1919 he was the director of the newly organized Oriental College of Commerce in Budapest. From 1919 until 1922 he held the same post at the Oriental Institute integrated into the Budapest University of Economics, and then from 1922 he taught Turkish linguistic at the university. In the summer of 1925 and 1926, invited by the Turkish government, he was professor at the Ankara and Istanbul Universities, besides this in 1925 he organized the Department of Folkloristics at the Istanbul University. He died during the soviet siege of Budapest.

At the beginning of his career he mainly focused on the dialectology, phonological and morphological matters of the Hungarian language as well as the ones of the Mordvinic languages. Being pupil of Ármin Vámbéry, his interest was directed towards Turkish language and philology. From 1885 until 1890, during his stay in Constantinople, he traveled to Rumelia, Anatolia, Syria, Palestine and Egypt. During his trip he observed and studied the characteristics of the Turkish dialects, ethnography, folk poetry and folk customs of Turkish and other local peoples. The most significant merit of him was that he collected an impressive amount of folk tales and anecdotes that were published in Hungarian as well as many other European languages. As a recognition of his scientific contributions, he was elected a correspondent member of the Hungarian Academy of Sciences, but he also was a vice-president of the International Society for the Investigation of Central and Eastern Asia.

== Works ==
- Turkish Fairy Tales and Folk Tales. London, 1896.
- Mundarten der Osmanen. Sankt-Petersburg, 1899.
- Schejk Sulejman efendi’s Tscagataj-osmanisches Wörterbuch. Budapest, 1902.
- Türkische Vorkserzählungen. Leiden, 1905.
- Türkische Volksmärchen aus Stambul. Leiden, 1905.
- Beiträge zum Studium der türkischen Sprache und Literatur. Leipzig & New York, 1907.
- Türkische Volksmärchen aus Ada-kale. Leipzig & New York, 1907.
- Türkisches Volksschauspiel. Leipzig, 1908.
- Forty-four Turkish Fairy Tales. London, Harrap, 1914, 364 p.
- Turkish Fairy Tales and Folk Tales. New York, Dover, 1969, 275 p.
- Kasantatarische Volkslieder. Hrsg. Zsuzsa Kakuk. Budapest, MTA Könyvtára, 1980, 138 p. = Keleti Tanulmányok.
- Kasantatarische Volksmärchen. Hrsg. Zsuzsa Kakuk. Budapest, MTA Könyvtára, 1989, 220 p. = Keleti Tanulmányok.
- Mischärtatarische Texte mit Wörterverzeichnis. Hrsg. Zsuzsa Kakuk. Szeged & Amsterdam, JATE & Holland, 1996, 192 p.
