= Anna Birgitta Rooth =

Swedish ethnology professor

- Born: 15 May 1919; Ängelholm, Sweden
- Died: 5 June 2000 (aged 79); Stenhotten
- Occupation: Professor of Ethnology
- Board member of: Zorn Museum
- Spouse: Gösta Rooth
- Children: 3
- Parents: Hildegard Sofia Helena; Nore Valfrid Waldemarson
- Awards: Pitrè Prize

Academic background
- Education: Lund University
- Thesis: The Cinderella Cycle (1951)
- Doctoral advisor: Carl Wilhelm von Sydow

Anna "Anta" Birgitta Rooth (15 May 1919 – 5 June 2000) was the first Swedish professor of ethnology at Uppsala University. She is known for her research into folklore, especially the Cinderella story.

== Early life and education ==
Anna Birgitta Rooth was born on 15 May 1919, in Ängelholm, Sweden, to Hildegard Sofia Helena and Nore Valfrid Waldermarson. She had two brothers, Bertil and Bo Waldemarson. Rooth enjoyed reading as a child and at 19, gained a school-leaving certificate at Lunds privata elementarskola, allowing her to attend Lund University the same year.

Starting in 1938, she studied art history at Lund University. She began pursuing folkloric research and served as editor and secretary to Carl Wilhelm von Sydow, who headed folkloric research at Lund. Working as an archival assistant, Rooth began a research project which later culminated into her thesis which she defended in 1951 under the direction of Carl Wilhelm von Sydow. Her doctoral dissertation, The Cinderella Cycle, continues to be a required reading in folklore studies. Writing for Svenska Dagbladet in 2017, Bengt af Klintberg characterized her 1951 doctoral thesis as a significant work in Swedish folktale research.

== Career ==
During the 1960s and 1970s, she published many more books on folklore such as Folklig Diktning. Form och teknik ("Folk Poetry: Form and Technique"), The Raven and the Carcass, and Loki in Scandinavian mythology. She also spent some time in Alaska and produced two works based on her field study of the Athabascan tribe and Inuit peoples.

In 1973, she became full professor of ethnology at Uppsala University, a position she held until 1985.

== Awards and honors ==
She was awarded the Pitrè Prize for her work.

== Selected publications ==
- Rooth, Anna Birgitta (1957). "The Creation Myths of the North American Indians". Anthropos. 52 (3/4): 497–508. ISSN 0257-9774. JSTOR 40454080.
- Rooth, Anna Birgitta (1961). Loki in Scandinavian mythology (in Swedish). Lund: C.W.K. Gleerup. OCLC 786246305.
- Rooth, Anna Birgitta (1962). The raven and the carcass; an investigation of a motif in the deluge myth in Europe, Asia, and North America. Helsinki: Suomalainen Tiedeakatemia. OCLC 963926.
- Rooth, Anna Birgitta (1976). Folklig diktning: form och teknik (in Swedish). Lund: Studentlitt. ISBN 978-91-44-06001-9. OCLC 185708957.
- Rooth, Anna Birgitta (1976). The importance of storytelling : a study based on field work in northern Alaska. Uppsala: Univ. ISBN 91-554-0430-8. OCLC 3033170.

== Personal life ==
In 1942, Rooth met Gösta Rooth in an art history course when he was a medical student. They had three children together, Birgitta, Helena and Ivar Rooth.
