= Green-Vanka =

Russian fairy tale about a helpful horse

Green-Vanka (Russian: Ванька-зелёный, romanized: Vanka-zelyony) is a Russian fairy tale (skazka), first collected in the 1930s and published in 1998. It deals with a friendship between a merchant's son and a magic horse that are forced to flee for their lives due to the boy's stepmother, and reach another kingdom, where the boy adopts another identity by only uttering the words "Green-Vanka", and defeats three dragons to protect three princesses.

According to scholarship, tales where the hero is instructed by his horse to always utter "I don't know" (or a variation thereof) are reported particularly in Russia, in Finland, in the Baltic Countries and in Hungary.

== Sources ==
The tale was originally collected by F. G. Fabrikov from a source in Metallstroya, Tekstilshchiki District, in Moscow Oblast.

== Summary ==
A rich merchant has a beautiful wife and a mare, but fears that, being childless, no one will inherit his wealth. An old woman comes and gives him an apple: half of it must be given to the woman, and the other to the mare. The merchant follows the old woman's advice and, nine months later, a son is born to him and a foal to the mare, which the story treats as brothers. The boy, Ivan, and the foal grow up together: after he returns from school, he grooms the little animal. One day, the merchant has to go on a journey to trade more provisions, and leaves his wife unattended.

While he is away, a clerk at his office begins to have an affair with Ivan's mother. The clerk convinces the woman to get rid of her son: first, by giving him a cake laced with poison. Ivan's horse brother warns him of the poison, and advises him to throw the cake to the dogs. Next, Ivan's mother gives him a new shirt. The horse warns the boy to bring the garment to him and put it on a pillar: the shirt begins to shrink until it strangles the pillar and crumbles it. Ivan then takes the shirt and the foal blows its nostrils over it, disabling its evil magic. Failing twice, the clerk realizes that Ivan's horse is helping the boy and advises his lover to feign illness and ask for the horse's liver as cure, when her husband returns. The merchant's wife does as instructed and fools her husband. Ivan goes to check on the horse, which is crying for its fate, but hatches a counterplan: Ivan is to agree with its sacrifice, but ask for tons of rope, a platform to be built on the property, and for his father to hire six butchers. Ivan follows the horse's plan: the butchers fail in tying up the horse with the rope, so Ivan does it himself, and create a commotion in the property.

Ivan and the horse then escape to another kingdom, where the horse advises him to buy some sheep's skins to wear on his head and to always utter the words "Ванька-зеленый". Ivan goes to work at a tsar's palace as a gardener, and builds a hut to live in. In this kingdom, however, a three-headed dragon demands the eldest princess to be given as a sacrifice. Three gypsy lads offer to protect her. Meanwhile, Ivan summons his horse brother and asks for provisions to battle the first dragon, then goes to meet the three gypsies. Ivan makes a deal: he will battle the dragon in their place, in exchange for the first joints of the little fingers from their right hands. It happens thus: Ivan defeats the dragon, buries its heads under a stone, releases the eldest princess, and goes back home to his shabby disguise. The next day, a six-headed sea dragon demands the middle princess, which is also placed near the shore to wait for the fiend. Once again, Ivan summons his brother horse to ask for provisions, meets the gypsy lads en route and makes a deal: his victory over the dragon in exchange for the second joints of their little fingers. Ivan defeats the dragon, buries the heads under another stone, releases the second princess and lets the gypsies take the credit. Some time later, a twelve-headed dragon appears and demands the third princess as sacrifice. Ivan summons his brother horse again, for he has to save the third princess, with whom he has fallen in love. The horse brother furnishes him with armour and a fire sword, and meets the three gypsies again, requesting the third joints of their little fingers as payment for the deed. Ivan defeats the third dragon in an epic battle, and, on the horse's words, buries the heads under a stone and leaves the corpse there at the beach. The third princess, seeing Ivan's bravery, gifts him her ring and dresses his injured hand with a handkerchief.

Ivan returns to his hut and lies down in bed for twelve days, to restore his strength. The youngest princess returns home with the gypsies, and goes to bring food to the gardener Green-Vanka. She enters the hut and sees a note on his body, her ring and her handkerchief on his hand, then realizes he is her saviour. Noticing that Ivan will not wake for another twelve days' period, the princess feigns illness to delay her marriage to the gypsy until enough time has passed. Her plan works, and she goes to greet Ivan after his long nap. The third princess takes Ivan to their wedding banquet, where her sisters and their respective gypsy suitors are. The elder princess spot the gardener and point him as their saviour. Ivan then continues to unravel the deception, shows the gypsy lads' cut off fingers, and directs the king to the stone he hid the dragons' heads under. The king banishes the gypsies and marries Ivan to the third princess. Some time later, Ivan decides to pay a visit to his home: he slices the clerk in two halves, who remains this way, and forgives his traitorous mother.

== Analysis ==
=== Tale type ===
The tale is classified in the East Slavic type SUS 532, Russian: Незнайка, romanized: Neznaika, lit. 'I Don't Know', of the East Slavic Folktale Classification (Russian: СУС, romanized: SUS): a hero is banished with his horse by his stepmother and, to protect himself, he is advised by the horse to always say "не знаю" (Russian for "I do not know"); the hero finds work as a gardener to another king, and, through heroic deeds, marries a princess. Similarly, according to Russian folklorist Lev Barag, one of the "typical contaminations" of type SUS 532 is with tale type SUS 300, "Победитель змея" ("The Winner of the Dragon"), wherein the hero fights against a dragon that menaces the princess.

The East Slavic type corresponds, in the international Aarne-Thompson Index (henceforth, AaTh), as tale type AaTh 532, "I Don't Know (The Helpful Horse)". However, folklorist Stith Thompson, in his work The Folktale, doubted the existence of the story as an independent tale type, since, barring a different introduction, its main narrative becomes "the same as in the Goldener tale [tale type 314]". This prompted him to suppose the tale type was a "variety" of "Goldener".

A similar notion is shared by Greek folklorists Anna Angelopoulou, Marianthi Kapanoglou and Emmanuela Katrinaki, editors of the Greek Folktale Catalogue: although they classified the Greek variants under type 532 (Greek: Ο Μπιλμέμ), they still recognized that they should be indexed as type 314 (Greek: Ο Κασίδης), since their only difference seems to lie in the introductory episodes. The Hungarian Folktale Catalogue (MNK) also took notice of the great similarity between types 532 and 314, which difficulted a specific classification into one or the other.

Furthermore, German folklorist Hans-Jörg Uther, in his 2004 revision of the international tale type index (henceforth, ATU), subsumed type AaTh 532 under a new tale type, ATU 314, "Goldener", due to "its similar structure and content".

=== Motifs ===
According to folklorist Christine Goldberg, in Enzyklopädie des Märchens, the "only specific motif" of type 532 is the hero's feigned ignorance on the horse's orders.

Professor Anna Birgitta Rooth stated that the motif of the stepmother's persecution of the hero appears in tale type 314 in variants from Slavonic, Eastern European and Near Eastern regions. She also connected this motif to part of the Cinderella cycle, in a variation involving a male hero and his cow.

== Variants ==
=== Distribution ===
Stith Thompson supposed that this tale type was "essentially a Russian development", with variants also found in Hungary, Finland and the Baltic Countries. In the same vein, Hungarian-American scholar Linda Dégh stated that the type was "particularly widespread" in the Central and Eastern regions of Europe.

=== Russia ===
==== Chekmen ====
In a Russian tale from Voronezh with the title "ЧЕКМЕНЬ" ("Chekmen"), Ivan-tsarevich is born to a queen, as well as a foal is born to a mare. The queen dies and the king remarries. However, the new queen despises her stepson, Ivan-tsarevich. When the boy returns from school one day and goes to the stables, the foal warns Ivan that his stepmother plans to give him poisoned bread, but he is to throw them to the dogs. Ivan heeds the foal's advice and discards the food; his dogs eat it and die. Next, the queen tries to give him some shirts after his bath, but the foal warns Ivan to throw the clothes on the oven. Failing her attempts, she consults with a priest, who says the foal is wiser than both of them, so she has to get rid of the animal by pretending to be ill and ask for the foal's bile as remedy to be rubbed on her body. This time the foal tells Ivan his stepmother plans to kill it, but the prince is to ask the king for a ride around the gates. The next day, Ivan follows the foal's plan and rides through the gates, then rushes away through the air to the "thirtieth kingdom". Now at a safe spot, the foal tells Ivan to find work with the local tsar as a gardener, and for him to buy metres of chekmen. Ivan does as instructed and places the chekmen on the garden. When inquired about it, he can only answer "Не знаю" ('I don't know'). Later that night, the foal brings some water of life to its master and Ivan sprinkles some on the trees. Whenever he is asked about anything, he only utters "I don't know". Despite this, the tsar's youngest daughter falls in love with him. Some time later, a nine-headed snake attacks the kingdom and demands the eldest princess to him. The tsar obeys and sends his eldest daughter to the snake. Meanwhile, the foal rides with Ivan to the scene, battles the snake and releases the princess, who does not recognize him. A "khokhol" coachman asks the princess to say he is her saviour, but cuts off two of his fingers and gives them to Ivan. The next day, the middle daughter is delivered to the snake as sacrifice and Ivan on his foal rescues her, but a "gypsy" coachman takes the credit for the deed and allows Ivan to cut off a stripe of flesh from his back. Lastly, the youngest princess is delivered to the snake, but Ivan goes to rescue her and is given her golden ring. He battles with the snake, but the foal is forced to help him. The king, satisfied that his daughters are saved, marries each them with their saviours. One day, however, the two coachmen and false heroes mock Ivan for his "I don't know" persona, and he, in retaliation, shows the king the cut off fingers and stripe of flesh from his brothers-in-law, thus giving away the deception they played.

==== Ivan Tsarevich and Idol Pogany ====
In a tale from Nizhnekolymsk with the title "Сказка об Иван Царевич и Идоль Поганомъ" ("Fairy Tale about Ivan Tsarevich and the Idol Pogany"), a tsar on his deathbed tells his son, prince Ivan Tsarevich, he has seven stores and stables with horses inside that the queen will squander, but Ivan is to go to one of the stables and find a horse for him. The tsar then dies, and the widowed queen goes to live with a person named Idol Pogany. Idol Pogany tells the queen to get rid of her son. She first makes him some bread with poison, but Ivan asks for some kvass to drink. While she is away to get the kvass, Ivan throws the bread through the window; some dogs eat it and die, their bones visible. The prince then goes to the stable and finds a "wonderful foal" inside it, and wonders if it is his father's inheritance. The foal replies with a human voice, to Ivan's amazement. The next day, the foal drinks honey and eats millet, and asks Ivan to ride with it out of the stables. Ivan fulfills its request and passes directly under his mother's window, where he sees Idol Pogany and her. The foal then says the queen will try to get rid of Ivan, so they ride to another kingdom, where he finds work as the king's servant. One day, however, Idol Pogany comes and demands princess Empireya, the king's daughter, otherwise he will attack the kingdom. Princess Empireya then confides with Ivan, who has taken the moniker Neznay or Neznayushka, since he always utters "ne znayu" ('I don't know'), for him to protect her. Neznay/Ivan summons his wonderful horse, goes with battle against Idol Pogany, and rides back to the princess, to whom he can only reply "ne znayu". The next day, Idol Pogany menaces the kingdom again, and again Neznay/Ivan rides the foal into battle. He fights Idol Pogany, who is described as a multiheaded creature. However, Ivan's hand is injured in the struggle and the princess bandages his hand with her silky cloak. Ivan returns to the fight and cuts off Idol Pogany's heads with his foal's help. Ivan escapes from the battlefield with the princess's silk cloak and turns back into Neznayushka. The king then summons every soldier in the kingdom in search for the cloak, so the princess can identify her saviour. Almost every male and soldier attends the gathering, save for Neznayushka, and none has the cloak. They bring Neznayushka to the gathering; the princess gives him a drink, notices the bandaged hand and proclaims she found her saviour. They marry. One month later, the wonderful foal goes to Ivan and explains his father was not only a king, but a wizard, and so was the foal, until Ivan's father cursed him into equine form, then says they should return to the stables where Ivan found it, take a whip and wrap it around the horse three times. Ivan follows the foal's instructions and goes with it, uses the whip on it and he turns back into a human. They part ways.

==== Ivan, the Merchant's Son ====
In a tale published by Aleksandr Matveevich Smirnov from Tobolsk Governorate with the title "Иванъ Купеческiй сынъ" ("Ivan, the Merchant's Son"), a merchant and his wife have no children, and they also have a mare in their stables who also does not have a foal. One day, a beggar comes to them and suggests the man buys an apple in the market and give half for his wife and half for their mare. The merchant does as instructed and his wife gives birth to a son they name Ivan, and the mare to a foal. Years later, when Ivan is old enough, his mother begins to cavort with a Zmei, who advises her to kill her son, then he will live with her. Ivan goes to the stables to check on his horse, and sees it crying. The horse then tells the youth that his mother plans to kill him, first by giving him poisoned milk; next, by giving him some stew, which he is not to eat. With the horse's warnings, Ivan avoids both attempts. The third time the youth goes to the stables, he notices the horse is crying, but the animal says it is for its fate, for Ivan's mother plans to kill it, but they can escape. When his father summons twelve soldiers to kill it, Ivan asks to be allowed a last ride on the horse, which his father, but his mother denies him. Still, Ivan mounts on the horse and gallops away through the gates, then reaches an oak forest. He ties the horse to an oak, and climbs onto the tree. The twelve robbers chase after Ivan, but cannot find him, so they return empty-handed. Ivan rides the horse and meets an old shepherd, with whom he exchanges clothes. The robbers return and kill the old shepherd, mistaking him for Ivan. Ivan's parents, just as the youth predicted before going away, fall from their position and become shepherds. Back to Ivan, he reaches another kingdom and hires himself as a servant. He is first tasked with drawing water: he ties twelve barrels to himself and drags them. He is then moved to cut firewood: he ties twelve bundles of wood and carried them. Still unsatisfied with his job, people place him as an assistant to the royal gardener. Ivan can only utter "не знаю" ('I don't know'), which earns him the moniker "Незнайка" ('Neznayka'). The king has three daughters, the elder princess married to a nine-headed zmei and the middle one to a six-headed zmei, save for the youngest, but the elder two also have other husbands apart from the zmeis. One day, the princesses are escorted to the zmeis; Neznayka calls for his horse, enters one ear and comes out the other, and resumes his true form of Ivan Tsarevich, then rides to the princesses' retinue. Ivan asks the princess to prickle him with a pin to wake him up when the zmei appears. The nine-headed zmei appears and says it has found food; the elder princess's tears fall on Ivan's face and wakes him up. Ivan fights the zmei, cuts off its nine heads and hide them under a stone. The next day, Ivan returns and fights the six-headed zmei. On the third day, Ivan fights a three-headed zmei, who has been courting the youngest princess. He cuts off its head, then nine and finally eighteen heads. Ivan cuts them all, hides them under a stone, then returns to the garden to keep up appearances, falling into a twelve-day sleeping cycle to regain his strength. The king arranges a banquet, but they cannot find Neznayka, the gardener's assistant. The youngest princess goes to the garden to check on the youth and finds him deep in sleep. People cannot wake him up, but after twelve days, Neznayka wakes up. The princess states that Neznayka was their saviour, not the guards that escorted them, for she recognizes the ribbon she tied to Ivan's hand to dress his wound. The king throws his daughters' bodyguards in prison, and gives Ivan/Neznayka a fine military jacket, per his request. Ivan/Neznayka goes to meet the king, who takes him and the bodyguards with him to the place where the zmeis' heads are buried. Ivan rides on his own horse, and lifts the stone, which the bodyguards cannot do, thus proving it was Ivan/Neznayka who saved them. He then marries Ivan to his youngest daughter.

=== Europe ===
==== Eastern Europe ====
===== Belarus =====
In a Belarusian tale titled "Нязнайка" ("I Don't Know"), a queen gives birth to a son, born on the same day as a foal by a mare. The prince and the foal become great friends, and the queen complains to the pope that he fell out of love for her son, and wishes to kill him. One day, the prince goes to the stables and finds the animal crying. The animal warns him about the queen's ploy to kill him: first, she will give him poisoned food, which he is to accept but throw out the window; the next time, he should go to the banya, take off his shirt and toss it over a stone. It happens thus, and the boy escapes twice from danger. The third time, the horse warns the prince their talks have been discovered, and they plan to kill the animal, which advises the youth to get some money and ask for a last ride on the horse. The prince does as instructed, and gallops away with the horse to another city. The horse tells the prince he has but to whistle three times, and it will come to his aid, then rides away. The prince then sleeps for a bit and, when he wakes up, finds his hair has turned to gold. He then finds work with a king's gardener, and becomes known as Nyaznaika ("I don't know"). One day, the king begins to ask the gardener to plant extravagant trees in his garden (first, a tree with silver bark and golden apples; next, a silver hedge with golden jackdaws). Nyaznaika's horse fulfills both tasks overnight for him and the gardener. Some time later, the kingdom is menaced by three multiheaded dragons (one with three heads, the second with six, and the third with nine), who each demands one of the three princesses to be delivered to them. Nyaznaika learns of this and rides into battle with his loyal horse: he defeats the dragons and is injured in some parts of his body (his head, his leg and his finger), which each of the princesses bandages. After he leaves the battlefield, a false hero jumps out of the bushes to take the credit for the heroic deed. Meanwhile, Nyaznaika, after defeating the third dragon, returns to the garden to rest with his horse, still wearing his armour, and is discovered by the youngest princess. The princess tells her father, who punishes the false hero and marries his daughter to Nyaznaika.

===== Ukraine =====
In a Ukrainian tale collected by ethnographer Borys Hrinchenko from Kharkiv with the title "Зла маты та сынъ, що побывъ змійивъ" ("The Evil Mother, who loved a Zmei"), a man and a wife have a son; the wife gives birth to a boy and a mare gives birth to a foal. The man dies and the woman raises her son, who becomes the foal's friend, visiting it in the stables. A zmei flies to the boy's mother, declaring he could live with her, if they kill their son. Thus, he gives her some lard for her to prepare some borscht for the boy, who is to eat it and die. The boy returns from school and goes to visit the horse in the stables. The horse trots its hooves and warns the boy his mother prepared him some dangerous borscht, which he is to give to the dog, which will die instead of him. The boy does as the horse instructed and survives his mother's attempt. Next, the zmei flies again and gives her some powder to put on a tea to poison the boy. The horse warns boy to avoid drinking the tea and drop it out the window; the boy does, another dog licks the tea and dies. The zmei comes back and gives some more lard, for the woman to prepare bake some pies with it. The third time, the horse warns the boy to eat only the smallest pie, not the larger one, which he is to toss out the window. The boy avoids another attempt, but a third dog eats the pie and dies. Defeated, the zmei realizes the horse is helping the boy and the animal must be dealt with. Thus, the boy's mother feigns illness and asks for her son to cut out the horse's heart as a cure for her. The boy agrees, but asks to ride around the garden one last time. The woman indulges her son, and he rides away with the horse. He stops by a field, releases the horse, and wraps himself in a skin. However, the fields belong to a king with three daughters. The king sees the strange boy and asks him about it, but the boy can only answer "ne znayu". The king takes the boy with him to his kingdom, and lets him live near the stove. One of the princesses falls in love with him. Later, a zmei menaces the kingdom for a ransom: three carriages filled with gold. The king does not have the money, and the zmei demands the monarch surrenders his daughters to him. The elder princess is taken to a tent to wait for the zmei, when Ivan (the boy) removes the skin from him, summons his horse with a whistle, and rides to protect the elder princess. He meets the girl and asks her to awaken him when the zmei appears. When the zmei appears, a teardrop from the princess falls on Ivan's face and wakes him. Ivan then fights the snake with the horse's help and buries its body in the sand, injuring himself in the battle. The elder princess dresses his wound with a red ribbon, and the knight rides away from the beach. Next, a second zmei appears, demanding the same ransom, which cannot be paid, and the middle princess instead. Ivan rides again to rescue the middle princess, fights the second zmei, killing it, and hurts his hand in the process. The middle princess bandages his wound with her green ribbon. Finally, a third zmei comes and demands an even larger ransom, which is also not paid, and it demands the youngest princess. Ivan doffs his lowly disguise, summons his horse again and rides to save the princess. He defeats the third zmei and again hurts his hand, which the third princess bandages with a blue ribbon. Ivan returns to the stove, while the princess is escorted in safety to the castle. The princesses notice Ivan's hand is bandaged with their ribbons, and realize Ivan was their saviour. The king then marries Ivan to his daughter.

==== Baltic region ====
===== Lithuania =====
According to professor Bronislava Kerbelyte, the Lithuanian Folktale Catalogue registers a similar type, indexed as AT 532, Arklys padėjėjas ("Horse Helper"): a boy and a foal are born at the same time due to their mothers eating either an apple or an egg, or a boy asks his father to buy him a horse; later, the boy's stepmother tries to poison him, but the horse warns him of the dangers and they both flee home to another kingdom; the boy finds work as a king's gardener and only utters the word "Nežinau" ("I don't know"). Most of the Lithuanian variants combine type AT 532 with type ATU 300, "The Dragon-Slayer".

===== Latvia =====
A similar story is found in Latvia, indexed as type 532, Kumeļš palīdz zēnam ("Colt helps the hero"): the hero's stepmother intends to hurt her stepson, but, with the help of the colt, he survives. The boy asks his father for a last ride on the colt and escapes with him to another kingdom, where he finds work as a gardener or a cook. In performing great deeds (e.g., fighting in the war or rescuing the princesses from devils), he marries the youngest princess.

In a Latvian tale titled "Конь-помощник" ("Horse-helper"), a king orders his three sons to stand guard on their hay meadows, since every night something comes and steals the hay. The first two princes, each on a night, fall asleep and fail on their watch. The third prince, considered a fool, offers to hold a vigil on the third night, and decides to sleep in the hay mound to surprise the thief. They soon appear: a mare with two foals, which begin to eat the hay. The prince wakes up, jumps on the mare and gallops with it for many miles, until it declares the prince tamed it. The mare then declares to be given to the first prince, the first foal to the middle prince, and he should keep the youngest foal with a bridle. The elder princes sell their horses, while the third prince keeps his in the stables. Some time later, a witch that lives near the palace goes to talk to the queen, bidding her to kill the foolish prince before he ruins them, and gives her some poison to put in his food. The third prince goes to meet the foal in the stables and notices its sadness, which then reveals the queen plans to give him some poisoned brew that he is give to a cat and pretend to have eaten. It happens thus. The next time, the witch returns and gives another potion to the queen, which she places in some meat. Again, the foal warns the third prince: he dips a corner of the tablecloth into the food and it burns with a blue flame. The third time, the witch warns the queen that horse is protecting the boy, and she should order the prince to kill the foal and tear out its heart. The prince consults with the foal on what to do next: the foal advises him to ask for a last ride on it, place the mare's bridle on it, and take three rides around the courtyard. The foal's plan is carried out, and both the animal and the prince fly away to another land. After they land, the foal advises the prince to shake the bridle and wish for a coat over his garments, then enter the city and only answer "Ne znayu". He enters the city with the coarse clothing and, due to his strange answer, he is brought to the king's presence, where he repeats the expression. The king decides to place him as an assistant to the royal gardener. As a first task, the boy is ordered to root out the trees; he uses the bridle, utters a wish, and the trees all fall down. For this, he is whipped five times and moved out to carry buckets of water. For the next task, he uses the bridle to wish himself stronger, accidentally dropping water down a chimney; for this, he is whipped ten times. As for his next job, he is apprenticed to a woodcutter and ordered to raze the forest. Again, with the bridle, he wishes himself strong enough to carry all the trees in the forest, and as punishment, he is whipped fifteen times. Later, the princesses are choosing their husbands: the elder two settle for princes, while the youngest cannot decide. The king chastises her, and she defyingly chooses the foolish servant. The youngest princess marries the foolish servant, and live well. Some time later, a devil appears on a mountain and demands the princesses to be delivered to him. The elder princess is delivered to him, but the boy uses the bridle to summon a silver horse, with silver garments and silver sword, turns into a knight and goes to fight the six-headed devil, releasing his sister-in-law and mockingly thanking her for "five whippings". Next, another devil demands the middle princess; the boy uses the bridle to summon a golden horse, golden garments and a golden sword, defeats a nine-headed devil, and releases the middle princess, thanking her for "ten whippings". Finally, the youngest princess is delivered to another devil, and his husband goes to rescue her, on a diamond horse, with a diamond clothes and a diamond sword. The diamond horse warns him that the twelve-headed devil will use an anvil that summons twelve blacksmiths as his minions. Advised by the horse, the boy destroys the blacksmiths and the anvil, then the devil, but is hurt in the leg. The youngest princess, his wife, dresses his wound with a kerchief, to which the knight thanks her for "fifteen whippings". The princess returns home and tells her husband, the foolish boy about everything, and notices his dressed wound when they both go to bed. The foolish boy tells her everything, and the princess goes to inform her father, the king. The king embraces his youngest daughter's husband as his son-in-law, and resigns that a fool will succeed him as king.

==== Czech Republic ====
Author Bozena Nemcova wrote down a version named titled Princ Bajaja, translated as Prince Bayaya by author Parker Fillmore, which he described as "a mosaic of two or three simpler stories". In the tale, twin princes are born to a king and queen. The king asks the queen for his favourite son to inherit the throne. Owing to that, the other brother journeys on his own, in the company of his faithful horse. The horse speaks to him and recommends his prince disguises himself as a peasant with a speech impediment (he should only respond with "bayaya" when asked). Czech scholar Jaromír Jech classified the tale as a combination of types 532, 300 and 530, and, based on Nemcova's annotations, tentatively sourced the tale to Hořice, in northeast Bohemia.

==== Chuvash people ====
In a tale from the Chuvash people titled "ИВАН" ("Ivan"), an old couple have, in their old age, a son they name Ivan. Soon after, the mother dies and the old man remarries, fathering three girls with his second wife. Ivan's stepmother begins to hate her step-son and plots to kill him: first, by giving him cake laced with poison; next, she hangs an axe over the door to fall on Ivan when he comes in. With his friendly horse's advice, he survives both attempts, but sacrifices his dog to the second attempt. The stepmother consults with a healer on how to get rid of the boy, and she is advised to kill Ivan's horse. The horse warns Ivan about the stepmother's plan, and plots with Ivan to have the boy ask for one last ride on the animal, and both can seize the opportunity to flee. It happens thus. They escape to the wilderness; the horse advises Ivan to buy a pigskin from a shepherd and fashion a cap. Later, they ride to another city and stop by its gates; the horse tells Ivan to find work as gardener to the local king, and that he should but whistle and the horse will come in a flash. Ivan finds work with as the king's gardener, and only answers "Не могу знать" ("I cannot know"). Time passes. The king's daughters are being taken to be sacrificed to a dragon, and the monarch promises to marry them to whoever can save them. Hearing this, Ivan summons his faithful horse, rushes to the lake and kill the dragon to save the eldest daughter. The same happens to the middle daughter. False heroes try to get the credit for the deed and are set to marry the elder princesses. At last, Ivan and the horse save the third princess, and ride back to the hut. A third false hero claims to her saviour and is also set to marry her. During the wedding feast for the three princesses, the king orders his knights to bring Ivan to the feast, since the entire kingdom is celebrating. Ivan rides the horse again and, entering the royal court, takes off his cap and shows his golden hair. The youngest princess then recognizes Ivan as her true saviour; the false hero is punished, and Ivan marries the youngest princess.

== See also ==
- Neznaiko
- Bogatyr Neznay
- Nemtudomka
- The Black Colt
- The Magician's Horse
- Little Johnny Sheep-Dung
- The Gifts of the Magician
- Făt-Frumos with the Golden Hair
- Iron Hans
- Fire Boy (folktale)
- The Enchanted Hinny
