= Nemtudomka =

Hungarian folktale about a prince and his horse

Folk tale
- Name: Nemtudomka
- Aarne–Thompson grouping: AaTh 532, "I Don't Know" (The Helpful Horse); ATU 314, "Goldener"
- Region: Hungary
- Published in: Magyar Népmesék, by János Erdélyi (1855)

Nemtudomka (English: Little I Don't Know) is a Hungarian fairy tale, first published in the mid-19th century by author János Erdélyi. It is classified in the international Aarne-Thompson-Uther Index as ATU 314, "Goldener". It deals with a friendship between a king's son and a magic horse that are forced to flee for their lives due to the boy's own mother, and reach another kingdom, where the boy adopts another identity by only uttering the words "Nem tudom" ("I don't know").

Although it differs from variants wherein a hero acquires golden hair, its starting sequence (persecution by the hero's own mother) is considered by scholarship as an alternate opening to the same tale type.

== Sources ==
The tale was first published by János Erdélyi in the mid-19th century, in his book Magyar Népmesék ("Hungarian Folktales"), in Hungarian. It was later republished by György Gaal with the same title (Nemtudomka), albeit with textual differences, and translated into German as Weissnitle by author Gottlieb Stier.

== Summary ==
The wife of a king in Scythia gives birth to a prince named Dániel, and, at the same time, a foal is born in the stables. The king presents Dániel with the foal, and they become friends. One day, however, one of the king's generals becomes the queen's lover, and they plan to kill the prince since he is too clever and may reveal their affair. First, they place a dagger in his bed, so it can pierce his heart in his sleep; next, the queen bakes him sweets laced with poison. With the horse's warnings, Dániel avoids both attempts. The general notices the horse is the one helping the prince, and tells the queen to feign illness and ask for the foal's liver as cure after the king comes home from war. When the king returns, the queen asks for the foal's liver, and the king tells Dániel they will kill his pet foal. The prince then asks his father to saddle his horse so he can run circles around the castle for three laps, then toast to their health. The king indulges his son one last time; Dániel makes a toast to the king, the queen, and the treasonous general, then rides away to London, England, while the king deals with the traitorous queen and her paramour.

Back to Dániel, the horse advises him to always answer "Nem tudom". Dániel goes to find work in the castle, and is hired as a cook's assistant. However, he is a disaster at the kitchen, and is given to the royal gardener as his assistant. One day, the people go to church, and Dániel, in his new identity of Nemtudomka, goes to meet his horse, which gives him a bridle to summon him. The next Sunday, everyone at the castle goes to mass, save for the princess, who stays at the castle. Thinking no one is at the castle, Nemtudomka summons his horse, which furnishes him with copper-coloured garments so he can ride the horse around the garden and trample the flowers - an event witnessed by the youngest princess. After the royal family and the staff return from church, the gardener complains to Nemtudomka and threatens to beat him to discipline him, but the princess intervenes on the latter's behalf. This repeats again for the next two Sundays, with Nemtudomka in silver and golden garments.

Some time later, the king decides to marry his three daughters: the elder two choose princes and the youngest Nemtudomka, and they move out to a shabby hut just outside the palace. Later, Nemtudomka's brothers-in-law go on a hunt and invite Nemtudomka to join them. Although he is given a lame horse at first, he dismisses the mount and summons his loyal horse to run ahead of his brothers-in-law: in the first hunt, he agrees to share the golden mallard in exchange for their rings; in the second hunt, he agrees to give them the golden deer if they allow to be branded on their foreheads with a signet ring; in the third hunt, he agrees to share with them the golden game, if they allow to be branded with a gallows on their backs.

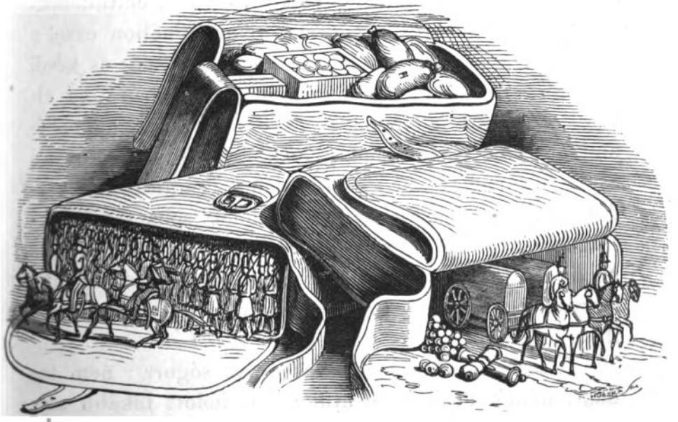
Nemtudomka's magic army in the bag

Later, Nemtudomka's horse gives him three magical bags (one full of unlimited ammo, another with infinite food and the third able to summon an army), since his father-in-law's kingdom will soon enter a war against Kukoricza Marczi. Nemtudomka and his brothers-in-law are called to defend the kingdom, but only Nemtudomka, wearing his royal garments, turns the tide of battle, but is injured in the leg during a fight. The king, his father-in-law, sees the knight's injury and bandages with his scarf, then the knight retreats to parts unknown. At the end of the tale, the king summons the kingdom for a feast at the castle, where Nemtudomka unmasks the boastful brothers-in-law due to their rings and marks on their bodies, and tells the king he is prince Dániel.

== Analysis ==
=== Tale type ===
The Hungarian Folktale Catalogue (MNK) registers type AaTh 532 as Nemtudomka (German: Klein Weißnicht; English: "Little Don't Know"): the hero is threatened by his mother and her lover (or by a stepmother) and escapes with his horse to another kingdom, where is advised to always answer "Nem tudom" (Hungarian for "I don't know").

Folklorist Stith Thompson questioned the existence of type AT 532 in the international index as an independent tale type, since, barring a different introduction, its main narrative becomes "the same as in the Goldener tale [tale type 314]". This prompted him to suppose the tale type was a "variety" of "Goldener". In the same vein, the Hungarian Folktale Catalogue (MNK) also took notice of the great similarity between types 532 and 314, which difficulted a specific classification into one or the other. In addition, Hungarian scholar Ágnes Kovács, in Magyar Néprajzi Lexikon ("Hungarian Ethnographic Dictionary"), stated that the "Nemtudomka" story was "the Eastern European" redaction of tale type 314, "The Golden-Haired Gardener", and most of the national indexes did not consider type 532 as an independent type.

Furthermore, German folklorist Hans-Jörg Uther, in his 2004 revision of the international tale type index (henceforth, ATU), subsumed type AaTh 532 under a new tale type, ATU 314, "Goldener", due to "its similar structure and content".

==== Introductory episodes ====
Scholarship notes three different opening episodes to the tale type: (1) the hero becomes a magician's servant and is forbidden to open a certain door, but he does and dips his hair in a pool of gold; (2) the hero is persecuted by his stepmother, but his loyal horse warns him and later they both flee; (3) the hero is given to the magician as payment for the magician's help with his parents' infertility problem. Folklorist Christine Goldberg, in Enzyklopädie des Märchens, related the second opening to former tale type AaTh 532, "The Helpful Horse (I Don't Know)", wherein the hero is persecuted by his stepmother and flees from home with his horse. (Note: According to Stith Thompson's 1961 revision of the index, in type 532 the hero's helpful horse advises him to answer every question with the sentence "I don't know".)

American folklorist Barre Toelken recognized the spread of the tale type across Northern, Eastern and Southern Europe, but identified three subtypes: one that appears in Europe (Subtype 1), wherein the protagonist becomes the servant to a magical person, finds the talking horse and discovers his benefactor's true evil nature, and acquires a golden colour on some part of his body; a second narrative (Subtype 3), found in Greece, Turkey, Caucasus, Uzbekistan and Northern India, where the protagonist is born through the use of a magical fruit; and a third one (Subtype 2). According to Toelken, this Subtype 2 is "the oldest", being found "in Southern Siberia, Iran, the Arabian countries, Mediterranean, Hungary and Poland". In this subtype, the hero (who may be a prince) and the foal are born at the same time and become friends, but their lives are at stake when the hero's mother asks for the horse's vital organ (or tries to kill the boy to hide her affair), which motivates their flight from their homeland to another kingdom.

=== Origin ===
Hungarian linguist Elemér Moór has noticed that the hero's name in Hungarian, "Nemtudomka", corresponds with the Russian-language "Neznaiko" (both meaning "I don't know"). This great similarity in names, he supposed, indicates a connection between the tales, but he could not ascertain whether the tales have originated from the Russians or passed into Russia from Hungary. Linda Dégh stated that the tale Nemtudomka was "popular" in Hungary, and suggested an origin in Eastern Europe.

=== Motifs ===
Professor Anna Birgitta Rooth stated that the motif of the stepmother's persecution of the hero appears in tale type 314 in variants from Slavonic, Eastern European and Near Eastern regions. She also connected this motif to part of the Cinderella cycle, in a variation involving a male hero and his cow.

==== The suitor selection test ====
The motif of the princess throwing an apple to her suitor is indexed as motif H316, "Suitor test: apple thrown indicates princess' choice (often golden apple)". According to mythologist Yuri Berezkin and other Russian researchers, the motif is "popular" in Iran, and is also attested "in Central Europe, the Balkans, the Caucasus, the Near East, and Central Asia".

According to Turkologist Karl Reichl, types ATU 314 and ATU 502 contain this motif: the princess chooses her own husband (of lowly appearance) in a gathering of potential suitors, by giving him an object (e.g., an apple). However, he also remarks that the motif is "spread in folk literature" and may appear in other tale types.

Germanist Günter Dammann, in Enzyklopädie des Märchens, argued that Subtype 2 (see above) represented the oldest form of the Goldener narrative, since the golden apple motif in the suitor selection roughly appears in the geographic distribution of the same subtype.

==== The gardener hero ====
According to Richard MacGillivray Dawkins, in the tale type, the hero as gardener destroys and restores the garden after he finds work, and, later, fights in the war. During the battle, he is injured, and the king dresses his wound with a kerchief, which will serve as token of recognition.

==== Branding the brothers-in-law ====
According to German scholars Günther Damman and Kurt Ranke, another motif that appears in tale type ATU 314 is the hero branding his brothers-in-law during their hunt. Likewise, Ranke stated that the hero's branding represented a mark of his ownership over his brothers-in-law.

Ranke located the motif in the Orient and in the Mediterranean. In the same vein, Hungarian professor Ákos Dömötör, in the notes to tale type ATU 314 in the Hungarian National Catalogue of Folktales (MNK), remarked that the motif was a "reflection of the Eastern legal custom", which also appears in the Turkic epic Alpamysh.

== Variants ==
Stith Thompson supposed that tale type 532 was "essentially a Russian development", with variants also found in Hungary, Finland and the Baltic Countries. In the same vein, Hungarian-American scholar Linda Dégh stated that the type was "particularly widespread" in the Central and Eastern regions of Europe. Also, according to Hungarian scholar Ágnes Kovács, in Magyar Néprajzi Lexikon ("Hungarian Ethnographic Dictionary"), tale type 532, "Nemtudomka", registered 17 variants across Hungary, but it is "more popular" in Palócföld, Northeastern Hungary and Transylvania ("Erdély", in the original). In addition, according to Dégh, the Hungarian Folktale Catalogue registered 34 entries of tale type Nemtudomka.

=== Nemtudomka (Heves) ===
In a Hungarian tale published by János Berze Nagy with the title Nemtudomka, collected in Heves from an informant named Molnár Margit, a queen is pregnant, and so is a mare in the stables. While the king goes to war, she gives birth to a golden-haired boy and the mare foals a golden-maned colt. The boy and the colt become great friends growing up. However, the queen herself begins to hate her own child and conspires with a tailor ways to kill him: first, she tries to give the prince a bowl of poisoned soup; next, she bakes bread with poison and tries to have him eat it; lastly, the tailor sews a garment that could kill the prince immediately. With the colt's warnings, the prince avoids the danger. Finally, his father, the king, returns home, and the colt tells the prince they have nothing more to keep them at home, and prepare to escape. The colt takes the boy to another kingdom, tells him to find work and always utter the words "Nem tudom" ("I don't know"), and gives him its bridle to summon it. The prince knocks on the castle doors, and its occupants ask the motive of his visit, but since he always says "Nem tudom", they cannot understand him. Even the king's three daughters ask him, the youngest the most empathetic towards him. She inquires him if he wants to be their gardener; he nods with the head and is hired as the royal gardener. Under him, the garden flourishes, to the youngest princess's delight. Some time later, on a Sunday, the king and his daughters go to church, and leave the youngest princess at the castle. While they are away, Nemtudomka summons his horse and asks it to provide him with silver clothes so he can ride around the garden - an event witnessed by the princess. This happens again in the next two Sundays, with Nemtudomka in golden clothes and diamond garments. Later, the elder princesses are already married to princes, but the youngest, stil unmarried, makes up a suitor test: whoever catches from her hand her scarf, her ring and a golden apple, shall marry her. Nemtudomka rides the horse in his diamond clothes, gets the items and runs back to his hut. The king discovers him and marries the boy to his youngest daughter, and has them move out to a henhouse. Some time later, Nemtudonka's brothers-in-law invite him to join them in the hunt, and give them a lame mount. As soon as his brothers-in-law are away, Nemtudomka summons his loyal horse and goes hunting for rabbits in the forest. The brothers-in-law are unable to hunt anything, and find Nemtudomka - whom they do not recognize -, and ask him if they can have some of his game. Nemtudomka agrees, as long as they agree to receive a stamp on their foreheads. During a second hunt, Nemtudomka catches red deer and agrees to share the carcass with his brothers-in-law, as long as they agree to be branded on their hands. Finally, the king summons his three sons-in-law to a feast. After the brothers-in-law boast about their hunting prowess, Nemtudonka points to their gloved hands and scarved foreheads as proof of their trickery, and tells the king the whole truth.

=== Nemtudomka (Palóc) ===
In a Hungarian language tale collected by Gyula Istvánffy from a Palóc source in Dorogháza, with the title Nemtudomka ("I Don't Know"), a king in Vélag has a son named Miklós Király (prince Miklós), who is raised by his mother until she dies. The king is convinced to find another queen, and remarries. However, the new queen hates her stepson, and, one day, says she is too ill for any remedy, save for Miklós's liver. The king agrees to sacrifice his son, and tells the youth about his decision. Miklós has a last request: to be able to ride around the garden on his táltos horse one last time. The king indulges his son, and the prince rides around three times; after the third time, Miklós spurs the horse hard and both fly over the gates, fleeing their homeland. After the long aerial journey, the táltos lands on near another kingdom. The táltos horse begins to talk and says Miklós is near the diamond castle of another king, advising him to enter the castle by the kitchen, lie on the ashes and always utter "Nem tudom" ("I don't know"). As a parting gift, the horse gives Miklós a silver bridle to summon it, and gallops away. Miklós enters the castle and sees two large white hounds biting away at something gold: an animal's entrail, which he puts on his head. He enters the kitchen in ragged clothes, and sleeps on the ashes. The kitchen staff notice the newcomer and ask him about it, but he can only answer "Nem tudom". The two elder princesses come down to the kitchen to talk to the youth, who again utters "Nem tudom". Despite the strange mannerisms of the boy, they let him stay by the kitchen, and employ him in their errands. Some time later, the eldest princess is getting married, and the court goes to church, leaving the youth Nemtudomka in the kitchen to mind the soup. The prince takes the opportunity of everyone's absence to summon the táltos horse for a ride around the castle patio, an event witnessed by the youngest princess, who was left behind. The princess admires the strange knight, clad in fine garments, and talks to him. He explains he has come from another land, and she gives her her diamond ring. Miklós dries some drops of sweat from his forehead with a kerchief, and the princess notices a mark on his head. Miklós rides away, dismisses the horse and returns to the kitchen. However, the soup has cooled off, for he did not mind the fire, and the cook chastises him. While people eat the soup and celebrate her sister's wedding, the youngest princess is despondent, for she misses the handsome knight. While she is tasting the soup, she accidentally bites her own diamond ring. She sends for the cook, who explains his assistant Nemtudomka did it, but the boy does not say anything else. Still, the princess falls into great despair, so the king decides she should be married off: he invites nobles and princes, but no one interests the girl. The monarch then sends for Nemtudomka to stay behind in queue, with the other suitors, for the princess to give a golden apple to her bridegroom. Miklós/Nemtudomka scratches his head, and the princess notices the birthmark on the youth's head, giving him the golden apple. The king is enraged at her choice, but Miklós/Nemtudomka explains he is a prince from another land, and summons his táltos horse. Thus, they marry.

=== Nemtudomka (Hosszúpályi) ===
In a Hungarian tale published by ethnographer Ákos Dömötor with the title Nemtudomka, a king and queen have a son whom they protect from everything, even the winds. However, the king has to depart for war, and leaves the son under the queen's care. The prince wishes to join his father in the war, but his mother forbids it. Still, the prince interacts with his pet horse. One day, a general arrives with a letter, and the prince goes to the stables. His horse begins to talk and says the general is too close to the queen, and both plan to get rid of the prince, so the animal suggests he avoids eating and drinking anything they offer him, and he should escape from the kingdom. The prince gathers some provisions, mounts on the horse and both fly away to another kingdom. They land in France, and the horse tells the prince to always answer "nem tudom" ("I don't know"), and to find work with the king, then gives him a whistle as a parting gift. The prince passes by the guards at the gate and is brought to the king, who takes him as a gardener's assistant. The king's three daughters enjoy strolling in the garden, and the youngest likes the new assistant, whom they called Nemtudomka. Some time later, the court goes to church, and the prince summons his horse for a ride around the garden. He doffs his idiot disguise and talks to the youngest princess, warning her to keep his secret, lest he destroys the kingdom like he did to the garden. When people returns from church, he dismisses the horse and goes back to his disguise. The gardener discovers the destroyed garden, and orders Nemtudomka to plant everything, lest he is hanged from a tree. After they leave for church in the afternoon, the prince summons the horse again and, after riding around the garden three times, restores everything. The youngest princess talks to him again, declaring her love for him. Later, three foreign princes come to ask for the hands of the French princesses: the elder two agree, but the youngest only wants Nemtudomka. The king is enraged by her decision, and moves her out to live with Nemtudomka in the chicken coop. Nemtudomka blows on the whistle and turns the chicken coop into a nice palace with a diamond roof, and the princess bears the brunt of her sisters' mockery. Later, the princes go on a hunt, and Nemtudomka joins them: he summons his horse and rides into the forest in a nice silver garment, then shoots at a golden eagle. His brothers-in-law do not recognize him and ask for the golden eagle; the prince agrees, in exchange for their engagement rings. The next day, the brothers-in-law hunt a chicken with golden eggs, which the prince, in golden clothes, catches and agrees to let them have it, in exchange for them being branded on their backs with their own engagement rings. Finally, the prince puts on diamond vestments and catches a golden duck, which he agrees to give to his brothers-in-law in exchange for their canines (teeth). After every hunt, the brothers-in-law boast of their success in hunting, while Nemtudomka is mocked for his failures. At the end of the tale, Nemtudomka dresses himself and his wife in diamond clothes and go to court to meet the French king. The prince, whom the king, his father-in-law does not recognize, asks the monarch about the other princes' success in their hunt, then produces the princesses' engament rings, to the latter's surprise. The prince then shows the markings on their backs and the lost canines, which serve as proof of their deception. The prince reveals he is Nemtudomka, and, mockingly, asks his sisters-in-law if they are happy with their marriages. The elder princesses renege on their respective husbands, and the princes flee the kingdom, and are still running. The tale was originally collected by Jószef Végh from a source named Maradi Lájos, in Hosszúpályi, Sárrét, albeit with slight differences: the prince saddles the horse and rides it around the patio three or four times, the king returns and makes a toast with his son, then the prince escapes on the horse from the kingdom to the land of France.

=== Nemtudomka (Szaján) ===
In a Yugoslavian-Hungarian tale collected by Olga Penavin from informant Törkő Ilona, in Száján, with the title Nemtudomka, a young son is born to a king, and a colt is born at the same time. The king gives the colt to the prince. In time, the prince feeds the colt with sugar. The king goes to war and leaves a person to take care of the prince and the queen. However, the queen begins to have an affair with the man, and both conspire to kill the prince before the king returns. When the prince returns from school, he goes to meet the foal, which warns him not to eat the soup his mother prepared him. The prince eats only the vegetable and avoids the meat, so the queen tries to give him another dish, this time poisoning the vegetables. With the foal's warning, he avoids the meal. The queen tries to poison her son a third time, but the foal warns the prince to avoid eating anything his mother offers him and to throw the plate at her. Failing a third time, the queen's lover suggests they kill the horse, so she feigns illness and asks for the foal's heart as remedy. The foal tells the prince they plan to sacrifice it, but he is to let the returned king ride the foal once, since he has never mounted him, and they will take the opportunity to escape. The following morning, the prince asks his father to let him ride the foal once, and they ride to another land, to another kingdom. The foal advises the prince to only answer with "Nem tudom" ("I Don't Know"). The prince finds work as a servant, as an assistant to the local king's old gardener preparing bouquets for the princesses. The youngest princess thanks the new assistant by giving him some gold coins as reward, which he gives to the old gardener.

One day, the old gardener tells his assistant to watch over the garden flowers, for he will go to mass with the others. When he leaves, the prince summons his foal with the bridle and takes a ride around the garden, stomping on the flowers, then dismisses his equine companion. The old gardener returns and scolds his assistant, Nemtudomka, but more flowers bloom in his wake. The next Sunday, the youngest princess feels she has a headache and stays home, so she sees Nemtudomka, their new gardener, summoning the horse and destroying the flowers. The princess vouches for him when the gardener scolds him again. On the third Sunday, she has a toothache and stays home, so she spies again on Nemtudomka: the youth summons his horse and jumps on the horse to kiss her, then destroys the garden so that new flowers bloom. After a while, the king decides to marry his daughters, and assembles a crowd of eligible suitors: the elder princesses choose noble, while the youngest cannot find her choice. The king sends for the only missing person, their new gardener, poor and silly Nemtudomka, whom the cadette chooses, to the king's horror. The monarch gives palaces to his two noble sons-in-law and places his cadette and her new husband in a wooden hut next to the palace.

Some time later, the two sons-in-law decide to go on a hunt, and the princess sends her husband to join them, despite him not being able to utter anything but "Nem tudom". The prince secretly joins them and catches a golden duck. His brothers-in-law find him and ask for the duck, which the prince agrees to give in exchange for branding their heads with a mark. The brothers-in-law agree, since their well-groomed long hair will hide the mark. The prince returns to his Nemtudomka identity and his wife laments he caught nothing. The next time, Nemtudomka catches a large rabbit and is seen by his brothers-in-law, who cannot recognize him, since Nemtudomka's horse had a different coat. The brothers-in-law ask for the rabbit, and the prince agrees to let them have it in exchange for branding their bodies with his gold ring. Once again, the cadette princess laments that her husband caught nothing, while her father favours the other two. The third time, all three hunt some deer. Next, war breaks out, and the king sends his sons-in-law to defend the kingdom, save for Nemtudomka. When no one is watching, Nemtudomka summons his foal with the bridle and rides into the battlefield, fighting the enemy horde and protecting his brothers-in-law and father-in-law. Nemtudomka is hurt in the back, in his arm, and the king bandages him with his scarf. The prince says he is from the kingdom of "deszkavár", and departs from the battlefield back to his wooden hut to rest after the battle. His wife, the princess, asks the reason for his tiredness and he says he was in the war. The princess dresses her husband's wound and notices her father's scarf on his arm, then goes to talk to her father. The monarch pays a visit to Nemtudomka in his house to see if he is sick and notices his scarf, which proves Nemtudomka was their saviour. Nemtudomka wakes up and reveals his identity to the king, revealing the other sons-in-law's deceit and the marks on their heads, ears and arms. The king expels the other sons-in-law and crowns Nemtudomka as his successor.

=== Nemtudomka (Tolna) ===
Hungarian-American scholar Linda Dégh collected a Hungarian tale from Hungarian teller Zsuzsanna Pálkó (Józscfné Palkó), a member of the Székely Bukovina community who lived in Kakasd village, Tolna County, in 1949, which she published as Nemtudomka, later translated to Russian as "НЕЗНАЙКА" and to English as I Don't Know. In this tale, a king and queen have a son they love very much. When the boy is four years old, the queen dies, and the king weeps and mourns for her more than it is necessary, something which the king's steward notices and tries to convince the monarch to think of the prince. Years later, when the prince is ten years old, the king is summoned to war and rallies his troops to fight the Tatars, but he worries about the young prince. The steward offers to take care of the prince and raise the boy with his own son in the palace. After the king leaves, the steward follows the promise for a month, then conspires with his wife to place their son on the throne instead of the prince. Thus, they begin to give the boy meagre food and banish him to the stables, where he works with the other soldiers. He helps the stablehands and finds a scrawny colt in the stables, which the soldiers explains only eats hay when the others eat oat, and vice-versa. The prince promises to look after the poor animal. One day, the steward and his wife go to church, and leave the soldiers to oversee the castle. They complain to the prince that they have never gone to church, but they place the prince in charge of things while they attend mass. After the soldiers leave, the prince tends to the scrawny colt. Suddenly, the animal begins to talk, and says that the steward plans to have them perish, and hatches a plan to regain strength: the next time the steward and his family go to church with the soldiers, the prince is to light up a fire and feed the colt its embers.

The next Sunday, after the steward leaves to church, the prince insists the soldiers join the others while he is alone in the stables. As soon as the soldiers leave, the prince does as the colt instructed and feeds it embers, then takes it out of the stables to the heap of embers which it devours. The colt becomes a five-legged, golden-maned horse, and tells the prince to open a cellar, steal a sword, spurs, a saddle and a bridle, don some clothes, steal some gold and mount it. The prince follows the instructions and mounts the horse, which flies off with him to the borders of the kingdom. The horse lands and the prince stops to rest, then the animal gives the prince a whistle and bids him always answer "I don't know" and keep walking towards the palace, then vanishes. The prince goes to the local king's castle and can only utter "I don't know", parading about town as a lost handsome child, with blue eyes, blond hair and rosy cheeks. One day, when he enters the local church, the king notices his presence and asks him about his origin, but he cannot answer. The king then sends for the boy, and his daughters, the princesses, request the boy remains with them. They call him Little I Don't Know and place him to work in the kitchen as the cook's assistant. The prince, as Little I Don't Know, spends months and years as a kitchen boy. However, he begins to deliberately falter in his work three times after the cook goes to church: the first time, he places a cat into the pot of soup; the second time, he places three ladles of ashes instead of salt into the food, and finally forgets a roasting pig in the oven and it becomes too smoked.

For his failings, the cook complains to the king and the monarch demotes Little I Don't Know to work in the chicken coop. As before, Little I Don't Know keeps doing mistakes in his work: the farmer notices there are missing and cracked eggs, which is due to Little I Don't Know juggling them and not grabbing them; then the farmer notices the number of chickens keep diminishing, which is due to the boy killing the tenth chicken after a count of nine. For his misbehaviour, he is demoted to work in the gardens. In the gardens, the gardener tasks Little I Don't Know with looking after the flowerbeds. After the gardener leaves with the court to church, the prince blows the whistle and summons a silver-maned and silver-coated horse, which he mounts to destroy the garden - an event witnessed by the youngest princess, who stayed home due to a toothache. The second time, the prince summons a golden-maned and golden-coated horse and rides around the garden to destrpy the flowers again. The third time, the prince calls forth a steed of diamond mane and coat and rides it around the garden to uproot all trees. The gardener returns from church every time and chastises the boy for his incompetence, but on the third time decides he has had enough and the monarch places him as a pigkeeper.

The youngest princess has witnessed the boy destroying the gardens and falls in love with him. Some time later, the local king decides to marry his three daughters and sends for eligible bachelors to come, and gives golden apples to the princesses to throw to their husbands of choice. The elder two choose men from the princely crowd, while the youngest withholds theirs. When Little I Don't Know passes by with the pig herd, the princess throws her golden apple to him, to the king's shock and disgust. He marries her off to the pigkeeper, banishes her from the palace and builds a wooden shack for them. The princess laments that her husband cannot utter anything else. Meanwhile, the king's sons-in-law decide to go hunting and try to invite Little I Don't Know, who only answers "I don't know". After they leave, the boy summons the silver steed and goes to hunt a silver duck, which he sells to his brothers-in-law for a hundred gold coins, since they do not recognize him. The second time, the sons-in-law go hunting, and the prince summons the golden horse to hunt a golden partridge, which he sells to his brothers-in-law, who do not recognize him, for a hundred pieces of gold. The third time, the prince hunts a diamond-haired deer, which he sells to his brothers-in-law for three hundred coins. After each hunt, the prince returns to his lame disguise of Little I Don't Know and suffer the mocking of his brothers-in-law, while the king organizes a ball in their honour.

During the third ball, the king receives a letter with news that the dog-faced Tatars are coming to attack the kingdom, and sends his sons-in-law to defend them. The brothers-in-law try to convince Little I Don't Know to leave their shack and join them, but he can only give the same answer. The Tatars advance into the kingdom after taking many cities, so the prince starts to worru for the kingdom and summons the silver horse, dons silver garments, and joins in the fray to ward off the enemy army, then flees the battlefield. The prince enters the battle a second and a third time on the golden horse and with golden garments, finally vanquishing the enemy army and saving his father-in-law's kingdom. He stabs his own leg and pretends to be injured, so that the king helps him. The king invites the mysterious knight to a grand celebration, and the knight asks to bring his wife. The prince returns to the wooden shack and finally tells his wife that he did save the kingdom and can talk, and they are to attend her father's ball. The princess is happy her husband can talk and agrees to go with him. The night of the ball, the prince summons the silver horse and asks for a splendid carriage and beautiful driving horses, then for clothes for himself and the princess, and both ride the carriage to the palace. After they arrive, the princess makes peace with her father, and the prince, Little I Don't Know, reveals the reason for his ruse, how he was a prince and fled his kingdom for his life. The king excuses his previous behaviour and makes Little I Don't Know his successor. According to Dégh, Mrs. Pálkó's tale is an oral retelling of a literary tale written by author Elek Benedek, A Deszkavári király ("The King of the Timber Castle").

=== Nemtudomka (Karcsa) ===
In a Hungarian tale titled Nemtudomka, collected from informant Pápai Istvánne, in Karcsai, a widowed king has an only son who lost his mother. The king also has a horse in the stables. When war erupts, the king departs to war and leaves his son under the care of a member of the court. The prince and the little horse grow up and become friends. Years later, the nobleman learns the king has fallen in battle and sets his sights on eliminating the prince: first, he places a sword on the prince's bed to kill him in his sleep. The little colt learns of the trap and warns the prince about the danger. The prince is surprised at the fact that the colt can talk, and the animal replies he should not sit, nor lie on his bed at night because of the sword and mentions the nobleman wishes to poison him, so they should escape. The prince jumps on the colt and escapes through the patio, past the gates and to another land. They stop by a lake and the colt says they must depart, but advises him to always answer with "Nem tudom", then gives him a gold bridle, a copper bridle, and a silver bridle to fulfill the prince's wishes, and gallops away. The prince reaches another city and always answers "Nem tudom" to the people, until he reaches the local king's palace and wanders in the royal gardens. The king notices the strange personage, but hires him as a kitchen boy. One day, he summons three horses with the bridles, and chooses one to ride on around the castle garden. The king's youngest daughter, who remained at home, sees him riding on the horse and falls in love with him. He kisses the princess's hand, dismisses the horse and returns to the kitchen to eat all the meat. The cook returns and, on not seeing the meat he was preparing, blames Nemtudomka for it, and he is reduced to work in the garden. The following Sunday, when the king and the court leave for church, he summons the three horses for another ride around the garden, kisses the princess's other hand, and stomps on every flower. The gardener returns and tries to punish Nemtudomka, but the king decides to spare him from punishment.

Later, the king notices it is time to marry his three daughters, and orders for men and youths to gather in front of the palace for the princesses to choose their husbands. Noblemen, counts, and officials assemble, and the elder two choose, respectively, a person of military rank and a prince, save for the youngest. The king notices his cadette has not chosen yet, and asks the soldiers to bring any missing person to the crowd. They mention Nemtudomka is missing and bring him in, and the cadette princess chooses him, to the king's great consternation. He builds a small wooden hut for him and the youngest princess, and move them out of the castle. The princess lives with him in their humble house, but dislikes that her husband always replies with "Nem tudom". Later, the king's other sons-in-law go on a hunt and try to invite Nemtudomka. Nemtudomka summons a copper horse with the bridle, dons copper armour and goes on the hunt, shooting a marvellous deer as his prize. His brothers-in-law have no luck on their hunt and see the copper-armoured knight, whom they do not recognize him. The prince/Nemtudomka mentions that the princess married a person that only answers with "Nem tudom", and they ask him for the deer. He agrees to a deal: the deer for their rings. The prince makes a trade and returns home to his Nemtudomka persona. The following day, the brothers-in-law go on a hunt again, and Nemtudomka summons the silver horse to hunt for a nice swan. His brothers-in-law cannot find any game, but find the silver-armoured horse rider and ask for the swan. Nemtudomka offers the swan in exchange for their signet rings. The third time, the brothers-in-law go hunting again, try to invite Nemtudomka, but cannot interpret his words. After they leave, Nemtudomka summons a golden horse with golden armour with the golden bridle and goes to the hunt. He catches a young bearcub which the brothers-in-law wish to have, so they strike a deal: the bearcub in exchange for branding their backs with their own signet rings.

The brothers-in-law bring the bear to the castle and they give a huge feast. A messenger comes with a declaration of war from a neighbouring king who is coming to take over the country with his large army, so the king prepares to go to war the following morning. The brothers-in-law go to join the king and try to convince Nemtudomka to join the fray, but since he says only "Nem tudom", they cannot discern its meaning. After they depart, Nemtudomka summons his little horse with the golden bridle and reveals his fears of the country falling in battle. The little horse gives the prince a bag and rides with him next to the battlefield. The equine bids the youth open the bag and out comes a large army armed with weapons, cannons and rifles. Nemtudomka fights for his father-in-law and captures the enemy king, hanging him by a tree, then goes to talk to his father-in-law, who does not recognize him. Nemtudomka reports his victory and the king accidentally injures the youth with his own sword. The king bandages the injury with a rip of his shirt, and Nemtudomka leaves the battlefield. The king returns to his castle and gathers the people for a celebratory feast. The brothers-in-law try to invite Nemtudomka, but he can only answer "Nem tudom". The king is despondent, since neither the mysterious saviour nor his army showed up. Nemtudomka himself goes to the feast and mentions he has his own wedding ring, unlike his brothers-in-law, then asks where his brothers-in-law's signet rings are, then produces them. The brothers-in-law are offended and accuse him of stealing, so Nemtudomka asks them to show their backs. The king orders them to do so and the duo shows the brandmarks on their backs. Nemtudomka then admits he was the kingdom's saviour in the battlefield, then shows the king's shirt on his leg as proof of his claims. The king recognizes his own garment and nominates Nemtudomka as his successor, but the youth says he has regained his kingdom. Scholar Géza Nagy classified the tale as types 532 and 314, and argued that the combination is "usual" in the Hungarian corpus, probably influenced by Elek Benedek's tale.

=== Nemtudomka (told by Tapsonyi Gyula) ===
Ethnographer Ilona Dobos collected a tale from teller Tapsonyi Gyula, in Somogy County, with the title Nemtudomka. In this tale, a king has a young son, and a colt is born at the same time. Sixteen years later, the colt tells the prince to saddle it so they can travel the world. The prince agrees to the horse's terms when the king appears and tries to stop him. The prince asks his father to take a ride around the garden three times, the first for his father, the second for his mother, and the third for himself and the horse. The horse then asks the prince if it should ride like the wind or the thought, and they gallop away beyond seven kingdoms. The horse advises the prince to only utter "nem tudom", gives him a bridle to summon it, and departs. The prince walks to the local king's castle and the guards stop him. The local king hears the commotion and goes to check it, finding the curious Nemtudomka, who shows the king his father's photograph, and the king asks whose son Nemtudomka is, but he can only answer "Nem tudom". Still, he takes the youth in and makes him work as an ox herder, but he can only say "Nem tudom", so he is moved to a gardener position, then to the kitchen as a kitchen boy. In the kitchen, at one time when the cook is not present, Nemtudomka places two plush dogs ("diszkutya", in the original), instead of vegetables and carrots, and ruins the soup. Again, he is demoted to work back in the garden, like watering the flowers and removing weeds. One day, when the court goes to church, the youngest princess stays home, and so does Nemtudomka, to look after the garden in the head gardener's absence. Nemtudomka remembers the bridle and shakes it, summoning a horse with diamond hair, diamond clothes, and a diamond sword. The youngest princess sees the event from her window, as Nemtudomka destroys the garden. When the head gardener returns from church and sees the devastation, he complains to the king about Nemtudomka, issuing an ultimatum for the king to choose either of them, but the king tells them not to worry, since it is the start of summer. The next time the court goes to church and the youngest princess stays at the castle, Nemtudomka summons a silver horse with horse ornaments and destroys the garden again. The third time, he summons a golden horse with golden decoration with the bridle, which is also witnessed by the princess, and Nemtudomka cuts the whole garden, save for four blades of grass in the four corners. The head gardener returns and, on seeing the destruction, removes Nemtudomka from his assistant position.

Later, the king tells his daughters it is the opportunity for them to choose their own husbands, so he summons the noblemen of the city, princes, barons, counts and foreign princes. The elder two choose their suitors from the crowd, save for the youngest. The king then sends for the rest of the populace, while ignoring Nemtudomka, and still his cadette does not choose. Lastly, they bring in Nemtudomka and the princess chooses him as her bridegroom. At church, while the priest is officiating the ceremony, Nemtudomka can only reply "Nem tudom" to the priest, to the king's anger. The monarch then hires carpenters to build them a wooden hut in the garden, and moves his cadette and her husband there. The princess asks Nemtudomka to say anything else, but he does not. Later, the king's two sons-in-law invite Nemtudomka to go hunting with them, but he dubiously answers "Nem tudom". After his brothers-in-law leave, Nemtudomka summons the diamond horse and rides to the forest, hunting some deer. His brothers-in-law meet him, who is wearing diamond armour, and ask his identity. He says he is the prince of Deszkavári. The duo ask him to give some deer meat, and Nemtudomka agrees to a deal: the deer in exchange for their wedding rings. A deal is made, and the two brothers-in-law pass by Nemtudomka's hut to mock him. The following day, the two brothers-in-law go hunting again, and Nemtudomka summons a diamond horse to hunt some diamond bustards, which he trades with his brothers-in-law in exchange for their branding their foreheads with the rings they gave him the day before. A deal is made, and the brothers-in-law receive the bustards, which they bring to impress the king.

Some time later, war breaks out, and the sons-in-law are at the helm of the king's army. The duo invite Nemtudomka to fight in the war. Nemtudomka goes to the stables and chooses an old gray horse, which dies on the road. As the battle against the black king rages on, Nemtudomka summons the diamond horse with the bridle, and rides to the battlefield to turn the tide of battle, since his brothers-in-law have been defeated. Nemtudomka, in the diamond garments, approaches his father-in-law, the king, saying he is the prince of Deszkavári, come to help him with his own army. The diamond knight kills the entire enemy army, save for the Black King's envoy, who hurts Nemtudomka in the leg, leaving a cross-shaped scar. The king notices their saviour is bleeding, and bandages the wound with his kerchief, then invites him for a celebratory feast, but Nemtudomka declines and flees. Nemtudomka returns to his lowly disguise and his hut, when his brothers-in-law pass him by. Later, during the feast, the king tells his cadette to look for another suitor, since he plans to execute Nemtudomka for placing the skin of the dead gray horse over the king's gates. The princess suggests her father brings Nemtudomka to talk to him one last time. Back to Nemtudomka, now that the seven year ban has elapsed, he begins to talk, and a soldier runs to inform the king. The king then sends twelve soldiers with an order to catch and bring Nemtudomka to the castle. However, the soldiers find Nemtudomka surrounded by a silver army, and retreat. Meanwhile, during the feast, the two sons-in-law gloat that they won the war, when Nemtudomka appears and introduces himself as their one true victor, and questions the brothers-in-law about their spoils of the hunt by showing their rings and pointing to the marks branded on their bodies. Finally, little Nemtudomka produces the king's kerchief, thus proving he was indeed at the battlefield. The king learns the truth, executes his sons-in-law, and nominates Nemtudomka as his successor. Ilona Dobos noticed that the teller, Gyúla Tapsonyi, drew from his own experiences in the war to add details to the narrative.

=== Nemtudomka 1 (told by Tapsonyi Margit) ===
In a Hungarian tale collected from informant Kalmár Imréné Tapsonyi Margit with the title Nemtudomka, a prince is born at the same time as a little foal. When the boy is twelve, the king, his father, gifts the prince the foal and bids him explore the world. The prince rides the foal and both reach another kingdom. The foal stops by the castle doors, gives the bridle to the prince and advises him to always utter "Nem tudom", then departs. The prince rings the bell and is taken in by the local king's servants. The local king has a picture of the prince, as it as custom at the time to send princes' portraits to other monarchs, recognizes him and tries to inquire the boy about his origins, but he can only answer Nem tudom, so he becomes known as Nemtudomka. The boy is placed in the kitchen to work with the royal cook. One day, while the cook is away, the boy places a dog's fur in the soup instead of bay leaf to season it, which the king eats. For this mistake, Nemtudomka is made to work in the gardens. One day, when the gardener leaves for mass, the prince shakes the bridle to summon the foal, and both ride around the garden to trample every flower. The gardener returns and sees that the garden is destroyed, so they make Nemtudomka build a hut and lock him inside. Later, the king's three princesses are made to choose their husbands: the eldest a prince and the middle one a count, save for the youngest, who cannot see her intended there at the gathering of suitors. The king then sends for Nemtudomka to be brought to the crowd and the youngest princess chooses him, to the kings horror. He marries the youngest princess to Nemtudomka and moves her out to the barn.

Later, the brothers-in-law go on a hunt and try to invite Nemtudomka, but cannot discern the meaning of his words. After they leave, Nemtudomka summons his foal and goes to hunt, catching a golden-feathered pheasant. The brothers-in-law cannot find any game and ask the stranger, who they do not recognize, for the pheasant. Nemtudomka makes a deal: the pheasant for their kerchiefs that the princesses gave them. Next, they go on another hunt, and Nemtudomka captures a golden-feathered ostrich, which he trades to his brothers-in-law in exchange for branding their foreheads with their wedding rings. Each time, they bring the birds and the king is impressed at their prowess. Sometime later, war breaks out, and the entire kingdom goes to war: the king, the court, and the two brothers-in-law, save for Nemtudomka, who is playing the dust. The brothers-in-law try to convince him to go to war, but receive for reply a single "Nem tudom". After they depart, the prince summons his foal and rides it to the battlefield to help his in-laws against the enemy army and repel them. During the battle, Nemtudomka is shot in the leg and bleeds profusely. He goes to meet the king, who does not recognize him and bandages the injury with his own kerchief, then Nemtudomka flees the battlefield and returns to his barn. To celebrate, the king announces that whoever fought in their side is welcomed to a feast in the castle. The monarch is proud of his feast and the guests, and warns his cadette that he will have Nemtudomka killed to get rid of his lowly son-in-law, freeing her to choose another suitor from the soldiers. Nemtudomka learns of his father-in-law's decision and attends the feast on the little foal in order to come clean: he explains he made a vow of only saying "Nem tudom" for seven years, but now the time has elapsed. The prince, now back to his true princely identity, accuses his brothers-in-law of lying about the hunt of the golden-feathered birds, produces the handkerchiefs and points to their branded backs. The prince then reveals he was the saviour at the battlefield by showing his injured leg and the king's own improvised bandage. The king then executes his sons-in-law and marries his cadette with Nemtudomka in a proper ceremony.

=== Nemtudomka 2 (told by Tapsonyi Margit) ===
In another tale collected from informant Kalmár Imréné Tapsonyi Margit with the title Nemtudomka, a prince is born at the same time as a little foal. When the boy is ten, the king, his father, gifts the prince the foal and bids him explore the world. The prince rides the foal, which asks the boy how fast it should gallop, like the wind or like the thought. They ride like the thought and beyond seven kingdoms, until they reach a castle's doors. The foal gives a bridle to the prince to summon it and advises him to always utter "Nem tudom", then departs. The prince knocks at the gate and the porter questions him, who can only answer "Nem tudom". The porter reports to the local king, who sends for him. The monarch feels the boy is familiar and inquires about his origins, but utters "Nem tudom". He places him to work in the kitchens. One Sunday, the cook orders Nemtudomka to use bay leaf on the pot and leaves, but Nemtudomka puts the cook's white dog in the water. The cook learns this and the Nemtudomka is demoted to work in the gardens. One day, the gardener tells Nemtudomka to remove the weeds and some of the flowers, then leaves for church. After he leaves, he summons the horse with the bridle and tramples the flowers, then dismisses the horse. Seeing the destroyed garden, the gardener informs the king, who has a shed built for Nemtudomka and places him there. Later, the king decides to marry his three daughters, the princesses, the youngest of which has fallen in love with Nemtudomka, who grew up to be a handsome youth. The king then holds a great ball and many suitors attend for the princesses to choose their husbands: the first a nobleman and the middle a count, but the cadette notices that Nemtudomka is not there with them. Thus the king sends for the noblemen of the village and servats of the plains, and still she does not choose any of them. The king then orders for Nemtudomka to be brought there and the princess chooses him. The princess marries Nemtudomka, who answers "Nem tudom" to the priest. The king is absent from the ceremony, learns that even during the wedding the youth uttered "Nem tudom", and banishes them to his hut.

Later, the brothers-in-law go on a hunt and try to invite Nemtudomka, but cannot discern the meaning of his words. After they leave, Nemtudomka summons his foal and goes to hunt in the forest, catching a golden-tailed pheasant. The brothers-in-law meet the stranger en route and ask him, who they do not recognize, for the pheasant. Nemtudomka makes a deal: the pheasant for the princesses' shawls they have with them. Next, they go on another hunt, and Nemtudomka captures a golden eagle which he trades to his brothers-in-law in exchange for their wedding rings. Thirdly, Nemtudomka captures a golden-feathered ostrich, which he trades with his brothers-in-law in exchange for branding their foreheads with their own wedding rings. Each time, they bring the birds and the king is impressed at their prowess. Sometime later, war breaks out, and the king's castle is being surrounded by enemies. The two brothers-in-law try to convince Nemtudomka to go to war, but receive for reply a single "Nem tudom". After they depart, the prince summons his foal and rides it to the battlefield to help his in-laws against the enemy army and repel them. During the battle, Nemtudomka is injured and goes to meet the king, who does not recognize him and dresses the wound with his own kerchief, then Nemtudomka flees the battlefield. To celebrate, the king holds a feast at the castle, and decides to execute Nemtudomka, due to being ashamed of his cadette's marriage to such a character. That same night, the foal, called táltos, goes to meet the prince and tell him he can speak again, for he is nineteen years old and reveal his origins to the king, otherwise the king will execute him. Nemtudomka attends the feast and admits he was the one who fought for them in the war, by showing the wound the king dressed with his kerchief. He then accuses the brothers-in-law of lying about their successes in the hunt, since he was the one who caught the golden-feathered birds, pointing to the brands on their foreheads as proof of his claims. The king then executes his two sons-in-law for their lies and embraces his cadette and her husband Nemtudomka.

== Adaptations ==
Journalist Elek Benedek adapted Erdélyi's version as the story Deszkavári királyfi, translated as The Prince and His Magic Horse, where the prince is named Dániel, born in Szyttia, and the court master tries to kill him by placing a large sword on the boy's bed.

== See also ==
- Donotknow
- Green-Vanka
- Bogatyr Neznay
- The Black Colt
- The Wonderful Sea-Horse
- The Prince and the Foal
- Cinder Jack (Hungarian fairy tale)
- En Mercè-Mercè

== Bibliography ==
- Kovács, Ágnes (1980). "Nemtudomka". In Gyula Ortutay (ed.). Magyar Néprajzi Lexikon (in Hungarian). Vol. 3: K-Né. Akadémiai Kiadó. pp. 704–705.
