= The Enchanted Hinny =

The Enchanted Hinny (Russian: "Волшебный лошачок"; English: "Magic Little Hinny") is a Romani-Russian tale collected by Yefim Druts and Alexei Gessler. It deals with a friendship between a merchant's son and a magic horse that are forced to flee for their lives due to the boy's stepmother, and reach another kingdom, where the boy adopts another identity by only uttering the words "Know Not Now", and defeats three dragons to protect three princesses.

According to scholarship, tales where the hero is instructed by his horse to always utter "I don't know" (or a variation thereof) are reported particularly in Russia, in Finland, in the Baltic Countries and in Hungary.

== Sources ==
The tale was collected by Russian ethnographer Yefim Druts and Alexei Gessler with the title "Волшебный лошачок" ("Magic Little Hinny") and translated by author James Riordan as The Enchanted Hinny. According to the Russian compilers, the tale was first collected from a teller in Mikhailovka, Leningrad Oblast, called A. M. Lobanova, born in 1907. Druts and Gessler also noted that the story was "quite widespread among the Romani".

== Summary ==
In this tale, a wealthy gypsy man trades in horses. His wife dies and leaves him their young son. The gypsy man remarries, but his new wife hates her step-son so much she complains to her mother. Years later, the man is ready to go to a horse fair and his son asks him to bring him the first thing his eyes greet when he enters the town. The man agrees and goes to the fair, setting his eyes on a pint-sized hinny. He buys the animal and brings it to his son. The boy treats and grooms the hinny. The stepmother's hatred of the boy comes to a head and she conspires with her mother to kill him: first, she bakes some rolls laced with poison; next, she gives him a shirt that will burn him to cinders. With the hinny's warnings, the boy avoids the dangers: he gives the rolls to dogs and throws the shirt in the oven. After failing twice, she and her mother discover the hinny is helping the boy, and she asks her husband to get rid of the little animal, since it bites her hand. The hinny advises the boy to ask for one last ride on the animal, then they will make their way to the distant mountains. It happens so, and they reach another kingdom. The hinny advises the boy to buy a sheep's skin and wears it on himself, and to utter the words "know not how" ("не знаю", in the original). The boy follows the hinny's orders and finds work as a cook for a king, and answers his questions "know not how" - which becomes his new appellation: "Know Not How" ("Незнайка", in the Russian original). One time, Know Not How goes to gather firewood, and chops down the tsar's sturdy oak by himself.

Some time later, the elder princess is to be delivered to a six-headed sea dragon, but the king sends Know Not How and three knights to protect her and defeat the beast. Know Not How kills the monster and is given a ring by the princess, but he insists the three knights are to be celebrated as the true heroes. The second princess is also given to a nine-headed sea dragon; Know Not How kills the dragon and is given the princess's necklace. Lastly, the youngest princess is given to a twelve-headed sea monster, but the three knights drug Know Not How with a sleeping potion, and he falls asleep. The monster comes and the princess sheds a tear that wakes Know Not How. The gypsy boy fights the multiheaded monster to a standstill, but his hinny comes all of a sudden and helps him vanquish the beast. He gathers the monster's heads and buries them in the sand along with those from the previous monsters, then sends the three knights and the princess back to the palace to celebrate. During the feast, however, the youngest princess asks her father to invite the gypsy cook. Despite his reservations, the king allows for the cook to come. At a certain point, the three knights boast about their "victory", when the youngest princess asks them to show the guests the monsters' severed heads. This leads to Know Not How revealing the truth, him marrying the youngest princess, and the three knights being banished.

== Analysis ==
=== Tale type ===
The tale is classified in the East Slavic type SUS 532, Russian: Незнайка, romanized: Neznaika, lit. 'I Don't Know', of the East Slavic Folktale Classification (Russian: СУС, romanized: SUS): a hero is banished with his horse by his stepmother and, to protect himself, he is advised by the horse to always say "не знаю" (Russian for "I do not know"); the hero finds work as a gardener to another king, and, through heroic deeds, marries a princess. Similarly, according to Russian folklorist Lev Barag, one of the "typical contaminations" of type SUS 532 is with tale type SUS 300, "Победитель змея" ("The Winner of the Dragon"), wherein the hero fights against a dragon that menaces the princess.

The East Slavic type corresponds, in the international Aarne-Thompson Index (henceforth, AaTh), as tale type AaTh 532, "I Don't Know (The Helpful Horse)". However, folklorist Stith Thompson, in his work The Folktale, doubted the existence of the story as an independent tale type, since, barring a different introduction, its main narrative becomes "the same as in the Goldener tale [tale type 314]". This prompted him to suppose the tale type was a "variety" of "Goldener".

A similar notion is shared by Greek folklorists Anna Angelopoulou, Marianthi Kapanoglou and Emmanuela Katrinaki, editors of the Greek Folktale Catalogue: although they classified the Greek variants under type 532 (Greek: Ο Μπιλμέμ), they still recognized that they should be indexed as type 314 (Greek: Ο Κασίδης), since their only difference seems to lie in the introductory episodes. The Hungarian Folktale Catalogue (MNK) also took notice of the great similarity between types 532 and 314, which difficulted a specific classification into one or the other.

Furthermore, German folklorist Hans-Jörg Uther, in his 2004 revision of the international tale type index (henceforth, ATU), subsumed type AaTh 532 under a new tale type, ATU 314, "Goldener", due to "its similar structure and content".

=== Motifs ===
According to folklorist Christine Goldberg, in Enzyklopädie des Märchens, the "only specific motif" of type 532 is the hero's feigned ignorance on the horse's orders.

Professor Anna Birgitta Rooth stated that the motif of the stepmother's persecution of the hero appears in tale type 314 in variants from Slavonic, Eastern European and Near Eastern regions. She also connected this motif to part of the Cinderella cycle, in a variation involving a male hero and his cow.

== Variants ==
=== Distribution ===
Stith Thompson supposed that this tale type was "essentially a Russian development", with variants also found in Hungary, Finland and the Baltic Countries. In the same vein, Hungarian-American scholar Linda Dégh stated that the type was "particularly widespread" in the Central and Eastern regions of Europe.

=== Russia ===
==== Neznamka ====
In a Romani-Kelderari tale collected from Kalderash teller Ishvan Demeter with the title "Незнамка", translated as "Незнамка" ("Neznamka"), a powerful king named Vitano has twelve daughters. One day, his youngest daughter, princess Lula, becomes pregnant, to his horror. The king asks the princess to take whatever she wants and to go away from the kingdom, effectively banishing her. Lula lives in the woods and gives birth to a son she names Mursha, who grows up in minutes. Mursha hunts in the woods and finds a wild horse he tames after mounting it three times. He names the horse Barshon. Mursha finds a house in the woods and they move there, unaware there is a twelve-headed zmei (serpent) living behind a locked door of the house. Whenever Mursha is not at home, Lula talks to the zmei and falls in love with him, so they plan to get rid of her son: first, the zmei tells Lula to feign illness and send him for an apple from an apple tree that grows on two mountains that crash against each other. Mursha falls for the trick, rides to the mountains and barely escapes the crushing mountains after fetching the apple. Second, princess Lula sends her son to the kingdom of King Tuntolo, where three dragons live, one with nine heads, the second with twelve, and the third with twenty-four heads, and take their hearts as her cure. Mursha takes Barshon to Tuntolo's kingdom and stops before a barn to rest. When he wakes up, he sees people approaching him and talking in a language he does not understand, so he replies to them "Neznamka", which becomes his appellation. Later, king Tuntolo sends his elder daughter to be sacrificed to the nine-headed zmei, and she says goodbye to Neznamka. While the princess is away, Mursha summons Barshon, enters through an ear and becomes a knight in copper, then rides to the well to wait for the princess and the zmei. The zmei appears, fights Mursha and is defeated. To reward her saviour, the princess gives him her ring. Secondly, the middle princess is given to the twelve-headed zmei; Mursha enters Barshon's ear, turns into a silver knight, defeats the second zmei, rescues the middle princess and gains her ring. Three months later, the third zmei demands the youngest princess, who is delivered to him by a well. Mursha enters Barshon's ear, becomes a knight in gold, and begins to fight the third zmei, with many heads. Mursha cuts off twelve of the twenty-four heads, but he summons his horse to bring him a whip, so he can kill the remaining heads. Mursha defeats the last zmei and rescues the youngest princess, then removes its heart, placing it with the other two hearts he retrieved from the previous zmeis. Mursha reenters Barshon's ears to regain his previous form and takes the youngest princess to her father. The cadette princess says that Neznamka was the one that saved them, he produces the elder princesses' rings, and the king thanks him as their saviour. Neznamka/Mursha chooses to marry the youngest princess and he settles in the kingdom for a while, when he begins to miss his mother and tells his wife he has to go back to her. The youngest princess understands it, and bids him to have a safe return, since she is pregnant. Mursha goes back to his mother with the three zmeis' hearts, which princess Lula gives to her zmei lover to eat. By doing so, the zmei lover gains the strength of the fallen zmeis, and accompanies Lula to the courtyard of their house. Mursha asks the zmei to write an epitaph on a stone that Mursha was buried here, and the zmei kills him. Back to Mursha's wife, she gives birth to twin boys who grow up in days. The twins ask who is their father, and their mother says their father was Mursha, the knight, who walked towards the sunrise for a journey. The twin boys make the same road and find their father's grave near a house, then begin to cry. A little bird perched on a nearby branch mocks the strong, yet sensitive knights, but the boys retort that the bird will find them the water of life to revive their father, and they will spare the bird's chicks. It happens thus, and the twins revive Mursha, who tells them about his traitorous mother and her zmei lover. The twins enter the house, and their grandmother, princess Lula, falls on her knees and begs for their forgiveness. The twins say they will not dirty their hands with her and want nothing to do with her, and ride back to king Tuntolo's kingdom with their father Mursha in tow. The compilers noted that the tale was a combination of the East Slavic tale types of "Traitorous Mother" (SUS 315), "Neznaiko" (SUS 532), and "The Dragon-Slayer" (SUS 300).

== See also ==
- Neznaiko
- Bogatyr Neznay
- Nemtudomka
- The Black Colt
- The Magician's Horse
- Little Johnny Sheep-Dung
- The Gifts of the Magician
- Făt-Frumos with the Golden Hair
- Iron Hans
- Fire Boy (folktale)
