= The Prince and the Foal =

Modern Greek fairy tale about a helpful horse

The Prince and the Foal (German: Vom Prinzen und seinem Fohlen; Greek: Το βασιλόπουλο καὶ τὸ πουλάρι, romanized: To basilópoulo kai to poulári, lit. 'The King's Son and the Foal') is a Greek folktale from Epirus, first collected by Austrian consul, Johann Georg von Hahn and published in the mid-19th century. It deals with a friendship between a king's son and a magic horse that are forced to flee for their lives due to the boy's own mother, and reach another kingdom, where the prince adopts another identity.

It is classified in the international Aarne-Thompson-Uther Index as ATU 314, "Goldener." Although it differs from variants wherein a hero acquires golden hair, its starting sequence (persecution by the hero's own mother) is considered by scholarship as an alternate opening to the same tale type.

== Summary ==
In this tale, a king has no son, so a Jew comes and gives him an apple for the queen, which she eats and becomes pregnant, eventually giving birth to a boy. A mare also eats it and foals. The foal and the prince become great friends and ride together. While the king is away at war, the Jew seduces the queen and convinces her to poison her son, so he cannot stand in their way. One day, after the boy comes home from school, he sees his foal crying in the stables. The foal reveals the queen, his mother, poisoned his food, so he should not eat it. After the first attempt is foiled, the queen tries to kill him by poisoning his wine and placing poisoned needles on his bed, but the horse warns the prince on both occasions.

After the king returns, the queen - once again, convinced by the Jew - feigns illness and the Jew tells the king that, by using the boy's liver, the queen can be cured. The horse learns of this and tells the prince. The boy, then, asks his father to give him three suits, one with the stars and its skies, the second with the springtime and its flowers, and the third with the sea and its waves, and allow him to ride around the palace three times with the suits, before he is killed. The king indulges his son one last time and gives him the suits, but the prince, cunningly, rides around the palace three times and rides away on the horse to another regions.

At a safe distance, he wears a smock and a raggedy cap over his suit, takes some hairs from the horse and tells the animal to come whenever he burns them, and dismisses it. The prince finds work in a city as a king's gardener. One day, while everyone is asleep, the prince rides the horse around the garden in secret, but he is spied on by the king's youngest daughter. Some time later, the king tells his three daughters to take a melon in the garden; the princess do and explain the melons as analogy for their marriageability (one overripe, another a bit overripe, the last ripe enough), so the king summons all available men in the kingdom for a suitor selection test: the princesses are to throw golden apples at their desired husbands. The youngest princess throws hers to the gardener. Despite the king's protests, the third princess marries the gardener and is expelled from the palace to live with the poor youth.

Time passes, and the king falls ill. The royal doctors order the water of life ("deathless water", in Garnett's translation) as his only remedy. The king's two sons-in-law ride away in gallant horses, while the gardener rides in a lame mule. At a hiding spot, the gardener summons his faithful horse and gallops to the fountain of water of life to fetch some in a flask. He waits for hie brothers-in-law and says he can give some of the water to them, provided they allow his horse to strike their bodies. The brothers-in-law consent and returns to the king. The gardener returns home and gives his wife the flask to take to her father. The king is healed and embraces the gardener as his son-in-law, but the youth orders the king to pave a golden path between the castle and the gardener's hut. The king obeys, and the gardener doffs the raggedy clothes, and rides to the castle in the suit of armor with the sea with its waves. The prince then orders his brothers-in-law to show the horseshoe prints on their bodies.

== Publication ==
The tale was first collected by Austrian consul, Johann Georg von Hahn with a source in Epirus, and translated to German with the title Vom Prinzen und seinem Fohlen. Danish linguist Jean Pio published Hahn's tale in the original Greek with the title Το βασιλόπουλο καὶ τὸ πουλάρι ("The King's Son and the Foal"), which was later published in Spanish as El hijo del rey y el potro. Author and folklorist Lucy Garnett translated it as The Prince and the Foal.

Author and folklorist Frances Carpenter adapted the tale as The Prince's Foal and sourced it from Turkey. In her version, there is no Jew, the queen has her own son (who is the prince's half-brother); the king simply banishes the prince, and the prince wears one robe, instead of three.

== Analysis ==
=== Tale type ===
The tale is classified in the Greek Folktale Catalogue as type AT 532, Μπιλμέμ (Bilmem, "I Don't Know"). In the Greek type, which registers 62 variants across the Greek territory, the childless queen is given an apple by a hermit or old man to cure her infertility, and the peels are thrown to a mare. Due to this, a boy is born to the queen, and a foal to the mare, which becomes the prince's friend and protects him from the queen's attempts.

Folklorist Stith Thompson questioned the existence of type AT 532 in the international index as an independent tale type, since, barring a different introduction, its main narrative becomes "the same as in the Goldener tale [tale type 314]". This prompted him to suppose the tale type was a "variety" of "Goldener". In the same vein, Greek folklorists Anna Angelopoulou, Marianthi Kapanoglou and Emmanuela Katrinaki, editors of the Greek Folktale Catalogue: although they classified the Greek variants under type 532 (Greek: Ο Μπιλμέμ), they still recognized that they should be indexed as type 314 (Greek: Ο Κασίδης), since their only difference seems to lie in the introductory episodes. They state that the Greek variants of type 532 reinforce the idea that Bilmem is a "particular form" of type 314, known in Greece as Κασίδη (Kasides).

Furthermore, German folklorist Hans-Jörg Uther, in his 2004 revision of the international tale type index (henceforth, ATU), subsumed type AaTh 532 under a new tale type, ATU 314, "Goldener", due to "its similar structure and content".

==== Introductory episodes ====
Scholarship notes three different opening episodes to the tale type: (1) the hero becomes a magician's servant and is forbidden to open a certain door, but he does and dips his hair in a pool of gold; (2) the hero is persecuted by his stepmother, but his loyal horse warns him and later they both flee; (3) the hero is given to the magician as payment for the magician's help with his parents' infertility problem. Folklorist Christine Goldberg, in Enzyklopädie des Märchens, related the second opening to former tale type AaTh 532, "The Helpful Horse (I Don't Know)", wherein the hero is persecuted by his stepmother and flees from home with his horse. (Note: According to Stith Thompson's 1961 revision of the index, in type 532 the hero's helpful horse advises him to answer every question with the sentence "I don't know".)

American folklorist Barre Toelken recognized the spread of the tale type across Northern, Eastern and Southern Europe, but identified three subtypes: one that appears in Europe (Subtype 1), wherein the protagonist becomes the servant to a magical person, finds the talking horse and discovers his benefactor's true evil nature, and acquires a golden colour on some part of his body; a second narrative (Subtype 3), found in Greece, Turkey, Caucasus, Uzbekistan and Northern India, where the protagonist is born through the use of a magical fruit; and a third one (Subtype 2). According to Toelken, this Subtype 2 is "the oldest", being found "in Southern Siberia, Iran, the Arabian countries, Mediterranean, Hungary and Poland". In this subtype, the hero (who may be a prince) and the foal are born at the same time and become friends, but their lives are at stake when the hero's mother asks for the horse's vital organ (or tries to kill the boy to hide her affair), which motivates their flight from their homeland to another kingdom.

=== Motifs ===
Professor Anna Birgitta Rooth stated that the motif of the stepmother's persecution of the hero appears in tale type 314 in variants from Slavonic, Eastern European and Near Eastern regions. She also connected this motif to part of the Cinderella cycle, in a variation involving a male hero and his cow.

==== The suitor selection test ====
The motif of the princess throwing an apple to her suitor is indexed as motif H316, "Suitor test: apple thrown indicates princess' choice (often golden apple)". According to mythologist Yuri Berezkin and other Russian researchers, the motif is "popular" in Iran, and is also attested "in Central Europe, the Balkans, the Caucasus, the Near East, and Central Asia".

According to Turkologist Karl Reichl, types ATU 314 and ATU 502 contain this motif: the princess chooses her own husband (of lowly appearance) in a gathering of potential suitors, by giving him an object (e.g., an apple). However, he also remarks that the motif is "spread in folk literature" and may appear in other tale types.

Germanist Günter Dammann, in Enzyklopädie des Märchens, argued that Subtype 2 (see above) represented the oldest form of the Goldener narrative, since the golden apple motif in the suitor selection roughly appears in the geographic distribution of the same subtype.

==== The gardener hero ====
Swedish scholar Waldemar Liungman drew attention to a possible ancient parallel to the gardener hero of the tale type: in an account of the story of king Sargon of Akkad, he, in his youth, works as a gardener in a palace and attracts the attention of goddess Ishtar. According to scholars Wolfram Eberhard and Pertev Naili Boratav, this would mean that the motif is "very old" ("sehr alt") in the Near East.

According to Richard MacGillivray Dawkins, in the tale type, the hero as gardener destroys and restores the garden after he finds work, and, later, fights in the war. During the battle, he is injured, and the king dresses his wound with a kerchief, which will serve as token of recognition.

==== Quest for the remedy ====
A motif that appears in tale type 314 is the hero having to find a cure for the ailing king, often the milk of a certain animal (e.g., a lioness). According to scholar Erika Taube, this motif occurs in tales from North Africa to East Asia, even among Persian- and Arabic-speaking peoples. Similarly, Hasan M. El-Shamy noted that the quest for the king's remedy appears as a subsidiary event "in the Arab-Berber culture area". In the same vein, according to Greek folklorists Anna Angelopoulou, Marianthi Kapanoglou and Emmanuela Katrinaki, editors of the Greek Folktale Catalogue, the quest for the king's remedy appears "frequently" as an episode in both type 314 and type 532. In addition, Germanist Gunter Dammann, in Enzyklopädie des Märchens, noted that the motif of the quest for the remedy appeared "with relative frequency" in over half of the variants that start with the Subtype 2 opening (stepmother's persecution of hero and horse).

== Variants ==
According to Germanist Gunter Dammann, tale type 314 with the opening of hero and horse fleeing home extends from Western Himalaya and South Siberia, to Iran and the Arab-speaking countries in the Eastern Mediterranean, to the Balkans and Sicily. In addition, scholar Hasan El-Shamy stated that type 314 is "widely spread throughout north Africa", among Arabs and Berbers; in sub-Saharan Africa, as well as in Arabia and South Arabia.

=== Greece ===
Greek scholar Marianthi Kaplanoglou states that the tale type AaTh 532 is an "example" of "widely known stories (...) in the repertoires of Greek refugees from Asia Minor". According to Richard MacGillivray Dawkins, the hero's name "Bilmem" ("O Bilimes" and variations thereof) derives from the Turkish bilmem, meaning 'I do not know'.

Von Hahn also summarized a variant from Ziza, near Joaninna, wherein the Jew lover, as doctor, prescribes the foal's entrails as remedy for the queen; the prince simply asks for one robe, instead of three, and the princess discovers him when he takes a bath in the garden and she glimpses the princely robes under his shabby disguise.

In a Greek tale from Chios titled Ό Μπιλιμές (From Turkish bilimem, 'I don't know'), translated as The Ignoramus, a king and queen have no children, so they decide to pray to the moon to solve their problem. The moon tosses them an orange. The royal couple each eat a piece and throw the peels to a mare. In time, the queen gives birth to a son and the mare a foal. When the boy is twenty years old, after the death of the king, he receives his sword and a golden-studded armour, and, after school, goes to the stables to meet the foal, which can speak. The widowed queen begins to have an affair with a Jewish pedlar, and both conspire to kill the prince for fear of future reprisal: first, they cook two cakes laced with poison; next, they dig up a hole in front of the door and cover it with a carpet. The horse, whose stall lies just under the queen's window, overhears their conversation and warns the prince of the dangers. Due to this, he escapes both attempts. The queen and her lover discover the horse is helping the prince, she pretends to fall ill and demands the horse to be killed to please her. The prince, however, stalls the execution by requesting a ride on his pet horse, and both escape to another kingdom. The prince sights a shepherd's hut in the distance and trades clothes with him, then walks his horse up a mountain. The horse tells him to cut off some of its hairs from the tail, and leave him to graze in the mountains, while he goes to the nearby city. The prince, in the lowly disguise, enters the city and only utters "Ignoramus" to everything people tell him. Ignoramus is brought to the king and is hired as his gardener, activity which he excels at, for he makes the garden more beautiful than before. On a certain Sunday, when people is at church, he summons the horse, puts on the princely clothes for a ride in the garden, and gives the princess a bouquet of flowers, then dismisses the horse. The princess decides to marry the gardener, and is banished to a low station. Later, war breaks out with an inimical king named Charos, and the king and his army march to defend the kingdom. Ignoramus is given a lame mount that becomes stuck in the mud. While the soldiers are away, he summons his loyal horse, rides into war and saves his father-in-law in the nick of time by killing the enemy king, but being wounded in the fight. The king sees his injury which he dresses with his royal handkerchief, and the prince rushes back to his "Ignoramus" disguise. Later, the king holds a celebratory feast on Sunday and invites all the princes, in hopes of seeing his saviour again. Yet, he tarries for a while until the meal time, when he appears with the handkerchief and reveals he was the Ignoramus gardener and the knight who saved him. The princess also reveals she knew this already, and marries the prince.

In a Cretan tale collected from a source in Partira, Heraklion, and translated as The Little Horse and the Boy, a couple have no son, and a mare with no foal. Wanting to discover the reason for this situation, the husband begins a journey to find a sorcerer, but meets his Fate on the way. The Fate gives the man an apple, to be given to his wife and its peels to the mare. The man follows his Fate's instructions, and a boy is born to his wife and a colt to the mare. The boy and the colt grow up together, and he visits the animal in the barn. Years later, the boy's fathers dies and his widowed mother has a new lover, who decides to marry the woman if she kills her son. First, she tries to poison his food. The boy goes to meet the colt, which warns him about the woman's attempt on his life, so he avoids eating the food. Next, the woman tells her lover she will kill her son herself. This time, the colt tells him they must escape: the boy places cotton on the animal's horseshoes to silence their flight and they depart to the wilderness. When they reach a kingdom, the colt advises the boy to find work with the king while he lies low in the mountains, and gives him some of its hairs to be summoned should the need arise. The boy goes to talk to the king and is hired as a servant. Meanwhile, the local king has waged war against a neighbouring monarch for quite some time, and they decide to settle their conflict by setting up a horse riding contest: whoever wins the contest, also wins the war. Riders and knights assemble and gallop ahead. The boy tells the king he wishes to take part in the competition, and the king, begrudgingly, orders for his soldiers to give him a lame mount. At a distance outside the kingdom, the boy summons the colt by burning its hairs, and they ride off to beat the other contestants. The boy takes the golden scarf as proof of victory, and rides back to the lame mount to keep up appearances. The contest is finished, and the king looks for the victory scarf. The boy shows him the gold scarf as proof of his deed, marries the king's daughter, and brings the colt to live with him at the palace.

=== Cyprus ===
In a Greek-language tale collected from Arminou, Cyprus, with the title Ο λοιτζιαρέτης, a royal couple have no children, nor does their mare birth any foals. One day, the king complains about it to a magician, who gives him three apples to be given to the queen and their peels to the mare. The king follows the magician's instructions and, nine months later, a prince is born to the queen, whom they name Theocharis, and a foal to the mare, which they name Faris. Years later, while the king is away, the queen arranges a "friend", who conspires with her to kill the prince. One day, before Theocharis goes to school he goes to greet the foal, which warns him the boy's mother has poisoned his food and that he must not eat it. Next, Faris warns about not drinking anything his mother gives him. The third day, Faris tells Theocharis that, on the queen's friend's suggestion, the foal is to be sacrificed. When the king returns, the prince asks his father to prepare him a golden saddle and a golden armour, and to allow him to ride Faris one last time. The king agrees to indulge his son, but the boy seizes the opportunity to escape to another kingdom. At a safe distance, Faris gives three hairs of its mane to the prince, then gallops away. Theocharis finds work as a gardener's assistant to a local king, and summons Faris to destroy the garden overnight. Theocharis and Faris keep their secret night rides, which are spied on by the king's youngest daughter, who falls in love with him. Some time later, the king assembles noblemen for the princess to choose her husband by throwing an apple to the one that passes by her window. Three times the assemblage passes, but the princess withholds the apple. They bring in the lowly gardener boy, to whom the princess gives her apple, signifying her choice. Insulted, the king marries them to each other, and moves his daughter to a chicken coop. Later, war breaks out, and Theocharis joins in the fray: he summons Faris, dons his golden armour and defeats his enemies with a sword. He is injured and loses a golden ring, but the king dresses his wound with a scarf. Theocharis departs and returns to his wife in their chicken coop. The king wants to know the identity of the knight, and the princess leads her father to Theocharis, whom he recognizes as the knight. Theocharis and the princess are married again in a grand ceremony.

== See also ==
- Adventures of a Boy (Azerbaijani folktale)
- The Black Colt
- Neznaiko
- The Story of the Prince and His Horse
- The Tale of Clever Hasan and the Talking Horse
- The Wonderful Sea-Horse
- En Mercè-Mercè
- The King's Son with the Star on the Front
