= Donotknow =

Russian fairy tale about a helpful horse

Folk tale
- Name: Donotknow
- Also known as: Neznaiko
- Aarne–Thompson grouping: AaTh 532, "I Don't Know" (The Helpful Horse); ATU 314, "Goldener"
- Region: Russia
- Published in: Russian Fairy Tales by Alexandr Afanasyev
- Related: Green-Vanka; Nemtudomka; The Enchanted Hinny

Donotknow (Russian: Незнайко, romanized: Neznaiko) is a Russian fairy tale (skazka) collected by folklorist Alexandr Afanasyev in his three-volume compilation Russian Fairy Tales. The tale was also translated as "Know Not" by Jack V. Haney. It deals with a friendship between a merchant's son and a magic horse that are forced to flee for their lives due to the boy's stepmother, and reach another kingdom, where the boy adopts another identity by only uttering the words "Ne znayu" ("I don't know").

According to scholarship, tales where the hero is instructed by his horse to always utter "I don't know" (or a variation thereof) are reported particularly in Russia, in Finland, in the Baltic Countries and in Hungary.

== Summary ==
A widowed rich merchant has a son, Ivan, and marries a new wife. When he is ready to go on a business trip, Ivan asks his father to find him his "luck". The merchant finds a scabby foal, and buys it. He brings it home and gives it to Ivan, who takes care of the horse and works at his father's counter.

Meanwhile, Ivan's stepmother begins to hate her stepson, and plots with "a wise old woman" to kill him: first, she puts poison under the house threshold. Ivan leaves his father's shop and goes home, but enters the stables to check on the foal and finds him crying. He questions the animal the reason why and the foal, in tears, tells Ivan that his stepmother has placed poison under the threshold, and he should let his dog enter the house first. Ivan follows the horse's warnings: the dog crosses the threshold and "it [is] torn into small atoms" (in Leonard Magnus's translation).

The stepmother's second attempt involves giving Ivan a cup of poisoned wine. Once again, the foal cries in the stables and warns Ivan of the next attempt. The boy simply throws the liquid out of the window. On her third attempt, the stepmother gives Ivan a shirt that will strangle him. With the horse's warnings, Ivan gives the shirt to a servant to wear, and he falls to the ground as if he is dead. Ivan takes off the shirt from the boy and throws it in the oven; the boy servant returns to life and the oven breaks apart in small pieces.

Failing all attempts to kill her stepson, the woman turns her attentions to the foal. After her husband returns from the journey, she pretends to be ill and tells her husband she had a dream that, if the foal's throat is slit and its liver rubbed on her body, she may regain her health. Ivan's father tells him of his intentions: the foal is to be killed to restore his stepmother's health. Ivan cries over his father's decision and goes to the stables. The horse is aware of its planned fate, and begs Ivan to save it, just as it saved Ivan, by having the boy ask his father to take one last ride on it.

Ivan follows the horse's instructions and flees with the horse to another kingdom, leaving a goodbye letter to his father explaining his reasons to leave. At a safe distance, the foal tells Ivan to pluck three hairs of its mane to summon it, and advises him to kill a bull, dress in its hide, put a bladder on his head as a cap, and only repeat the words "Idonotknow". The horse then vanishes. Ivan sails with a crew and only repeats "Idonotknow" to the sailor. Finally, Ivan reaches a kingdom, where the king hires him as a scarecrow for his gardens.

The king has three daughters, the third the most beautiful of the lot. A foreign Arab prince tells her father he wants her, either by choice or by force, but the king refuses to surrender her to the Arab prince and he moves his armies to invade the kingdom. Ivan learns of this and summons his loyal horse by burning one of its hairs. The horse appears at once, and takes Ivan to the battlefield. Ivan vanquishes several soldiers, steals a helmet to conceal his face, and leaves only the Arab prince and a few soldiers alive, then goes back to the gardener, dismisses the horse, and resumes his menial work.

Some time later, the Arab prince sends another letter asking for the king's third princess, and is still denied, so he prepares another attack. Ivan Donotknow ditches his shabby disguise, summons the horse and rides again to battle, where he fights every Arab knight, leaving some alive to tell the tale. Ivan, however, is injured in his hand by one of the Arab soldiers, and the princess, seeing his wound, takes a kerchief and wraps it around Ivan's hand.

Time passes, and the king decides to marry his two elder daughters to famous Tsarevichi. During the celebrations, the guests take notice of Donotknow as he works in the garden, and inquire about his presence there. The king explains that the man at garden is Donotknow and works as a scarecrow. However, the third princess recognizes her kerchief wrapped around his hand. After a while, she begins to visit the garden to be next to him, and eventually asks her father to wed them both. The king then marries his daughter to Donotknow.

Finally, the Arab prince sends another letter asking for the princess, but the king writes him back that she is betrothed to Donotknow, and invites him to come see it for himself. The Arab prince comes and, seeing the strange man Donotknow, summons him to a mortal combat. Ivan Donotknow once again shirks his shabby disguise, summons the horse and rides into the open field to fight the Arab prince. After a long fight, Ivan kills the Arab prince, and his father-in-law, the king, recognizes Ivan not as the lowly gardener, but as a brave knight. Ivan marries the princess, brings his merchant father to live with him, and punishes his traitorous stepmother.

== Analysis ==
=== Tale type ===
The tale is classified - and gives its name - to the East Slavic type SUS 532, Russian: Незнайка, romanized: Neznaika, lit. 'I Don't Know', of the East Slavic Folktale Classification (Russian: СУС, romanized: SUS): a hero is banished with his horse by his stepmother and, to protect himself, he is advised by the horse to always say "не знаю" (Russian for "I do not know"); the hero finds work as a gardener to another king, and, through heroic deeds, marries a princess.

The East Slavic type corresponds, in the international Aarne-Thompson Index (henceforth, AaTh), as tale type AaTh 532, "I Don't Know (The Helpful Horse)". However, folklorist Stith Thompson, in his work The Folktale, doubted the existence of the story as an independent tale type, since, barring a different introduction, its main narrative becomes "the same as in the Goldener tale [tale type 314]". This prompted him to suppose the tale type was a "variety" of "Goldener".

A similar notion is shared by Greek folklorists Anna Angelopoulou, Marianthi Kapanoglou and Emmanuela Katrinaki, editors of the Greek Folktale Catalogue: although they classified the Greek variants under type 532 (Greek: Ο Μπιλμέμ), they still recognized that they should be indexed as type 314 (Greek: Ο Κασίδης), since their only difference seems to lie in the introductory episodes. The Hungarian Folktale Catalogue (MNK) also took notice of the great similarity between types 532 and 314, which difficulted a specific classification into one or the other.

Furthermore, German folklorist Hans-Jörg Uther, in his 2004 revision of the international tale type index (henceforth, ATU), subsumed type AaTh 532 under a new tale type, ATU 314, "Goldener", due to "its similar structure and content".

=== Motifs ===
According to folklorist Christine Goldberg, in Enzyklopädie des Märchens, the "only specific motif" of type 532 is the hero's feigned ignorance on the horse's orders.

Professor Anna Birgitta Rooth stated that the motif of the stepmother's persecution of the hero appears in tale type 314 in variants from Slavonic, Eastern European and Near Eastern regions. She also connected this motif to part of the Cinderella cycle, in a variation involving a male hero and his cow.

Hungarian linguist Elemér Moór has noticed that the name "Nemtudomka", from the Nemtudomka fairy tale, corresponds with the Russian-language "Neznaiko" (both meaning "I don't know"). This great similarity in names, he supposed, indicates a connection between the tales, but he could not ascertain whether the tales have originated from the Russians or passed into Russia from Hungary.

== Variants ==
=== Distribution ===
Stith Thompson supposed that this tale type was "essentially a Russian development", with variants also found in Hungary, Finland and the Baltic Countries. In the same vein, Hungarian-American scholar Linda Dégh stated that the type was "particularly widespread" in the Central and Eastern regions of Europe.

=== Russia ===
==== Predecessors ====
One of the oldest attestations of the tale type in Russia is the tale "Сказка о тридесяти трёх летнем сидне Иване-крестьянском сыне" ("Fairy Tale about 33-years-old Ivan, the Peasant's Son"), dated to 1788. In this tale, the titular Ivan, the Peasant's Son, is the son of a peasant couple, but suffers from not moving his legs for years, until he is 33 years old. At this age, an old beggar man pays a visit to Ivan's parents' house and somehow cures Ivan. His parents celebrate, but Ivan wants to travel the world. In his wanderings, he goes to another kingdom, where, at the request of the king, stops "a great noise". In return, Ivan summons a retinue of workers and they excavate a spot on the ground: they find a large vault with a large iron door with a copper ring. Inside, Ivan finds a horse and armor. The horse can talk and tells Ivan it was hidden in the vault by hero Lukoper, but it has been waiting for Ivan as its new rider. Ivan takes the horse with him and rides to "Китайское" (Russian language: "China"), where he places a cap on his head and only answers "Не знаю" ("I don't know"). He finds work as the Chinese emperor's gardener, and draws the attention - and love - of the youngest princess. Some time later, the emperor asks his three daughters to be married: the elder two, Dauzo and Siaoyu, choose noble princes, while the youngest, Lotaoyu (Loatoa, in another spelling), wants to marry the gardener. Despite the emperor's protests, she is adamant in her choice, and their father sends messages to their potential husbands. However, a spurred prince named Polkan decides to attack the kingdom to take princess Loatoa by force. Ivan, the Peasant's Son, summons his horse (called "Sivko-Burko" in the story), and fights the enemy army three times as a mysterious knight. After the third time, Loatoa notices the knight's injured hand and bandages it. Ivan, the Peasant's Son, returns to the gardener's hut and, exhausted due to the war, lies in bed for three days. His wife, princess Loatoa, enters his hut and recognizes the handkerchief on him.

As part of his work A Russian garland of Fairy Tales, medievalist Robert Steele translated the tale as Story of Ivan, the Peasant's Son, wherein the Chinese emperor is named Chinese Tsar, and the princesses Duasa, Skao and Lotao. In the preface to his book, Steele stated that the work contained translations of Russian "peasant Chap-books" from the first half of the 19th century. Sinologist Boris L. Riftin suggested that the names of the princesses and the setting of this tale (China) may indicate that the story was adapted from an Eastern source, either from Central Asia or the Middle East.

==== Ivan Kruchina ====
Russian author Bogdan Bronnitsin published a Russian variant with the title "Сказка о Иване Кручине, купеческом сыне" ("Fairy Tale about Ivan Kruchina, the Merchant's Son"), which was translated as Ivan Kruchina. In this tale, Kruchina is an old merchant, and Ivan (or Ivanushka) is his young son. One day, he marries a young woman, and goes away on business. While Kruchina is away, his second wife begins to receive "visitors", which she explains to her step-son are her relations. Ivan says he will tell his father when he comes back, and his stepmother, warned by a servant, tries to kill him: first, by giving him poisoned wine; next, by giving him a poisoned cake. Ivan is warned of the danger by a talking horse his father kept in the stables. The stepmother's servant reveals to her mistress the horse was guarding the boy, and tries to take it to drink a pail of poisoned water. Ivan arrives just in time to stop the deed. Failing all attempts, the stepmother feigns illness and tells her husband, recently returned, that she needs the horse's gall as cure. Kruchina makes preparations to kill the horse, but his son Ivan asks to feed it and ride it one last time. The horse drops Ivan and kicks him three times, increasing the boy's strength, and telling him to ask for a last ride. Kruchina indulges his son, and Ivan gallops away with the horse anywhere else. He meets an old lady on the road and lifts her cart. In thanks, the old lady, who is Death herself, kills him, which scares off his horse. A falcon flying overhead, which was carrying a vial of water of life and water of death, sees Ivan's dead body and flies down to revive him with the vials. Ivan is resurrected and told by the falcon his horse fled to a city surrounded by walls of crystal and marble. Ivan tries to enter the city, but is captured and taken to the city's king, who inquires Ivan about his identity. Ivan only answers "I don't know". The king supposes Ivan is putting up an act, but decides to hire him as keeper of the treasury. He is given the keys to the treasury, and opens a door; inside, the talking horse, chained to a wall. The horse urges Ivan to release it, take a brush and a glove, and ride away from the city in a "Magical Flight" sequence: Ivan throws the objects to delay their pursuers (the glove creates a dense forest and the brush a mountain). Ivan reaches another kingdom, where he finds work as a czar's gardener. The czar's third princess, still unmarried, unlike her elder sisters, falls in love with the gardener and wraps her handkerchief around his finger when a thorn prickles his skin. Later, the kingdom is attacked by an enemy army, and Ivan rides into battle on the talking horse. After the second battle, the princess recognizes her handkerchief on the knight, who lifts his helmet to show the czar his face: Ivan, the gardener.

==== Neznaika (Korolkova) ====
In a tale collected from writer and storyteller Anna N. Korolkova with the title "Незнайка" ("Neznaika"), in a kingdom a widower lives with his son, called Neznaika since he always answers "ne znay". The man marries a second time, but his new wife beats Neznaika. One day, the widower asks his son what he can buy him, and the boy answers he wants a little horse he will take care of. After he buys him the horse, the animal warns the boy his stepmother wants to kill him: first, by giving him poisoned doughnuts which he is to throw to the dogs; next, by giving him a shirt rigged to kill him as soon as he wears it after he leaves the bath. With the horse's warnings, Neznaika avoids the danger. Seeing that her attempts failed, she is visited by a priest, who reveals to her the boy's horse is protecting him, so they need to get rid of the animal. The priest thus advises the woman to feign illness and ask for the heart of a "heroic horse" as her remedy. The woman manages to trick her husband. Neznaika goes to the stables and finds his friend in tears, since the next morning they will kill the animal, thus the horse pleads to Neznaika to save it, just as it saved the boy: Neznaika is to ask his father for one last ride on the horse. The next day, as his father and guests prepare to sacrifice the horse, and Neznaika asks for a last ride on it. The priest tries to dissuade the boy's father, but he allows it. Neznaika circles around three times, then jumps away to another kingdom. At a distance, the horse advises the boy to find work as a gardener to the king, and should he need it, the boy has but to whistle and the horse will appear. Neznaika goes to the king and offers to be his gardener. One day, he uproots the trees and burns the trunks, razing the garden. The king complains to him, but Neznaika answers "he does not know". The following morning, with the horse's help Neznaika builds a garden more beautiful than the previous one, with streams and fountains, birds and animals, to the king's surprise. Some time later, the king's daughter, the princess, goes to the garden to pick flowers, and talks to Neznaika. The youth confides in his horse that he fell in love with the princess, and the horse hatches a plan: Neznaika is to give a certain apple to the princess, who will eat and fall asleep; the king then will promise to marry her to whoever wakes her up, and Neznaika is to grab the opportunity to save her. With the horse's guidance, the youth follows its plan and goes to find the princess's cure: water from a fountain under a stone near an oak tree in the forest. He wakes the princess and marries her.

==== Little Brother ====
In a Russian tale from a Volga teller collected in 1970 and published by folklorist Vladimir N. Morokhin with the title "Братишка" ("Little Brother"), a merchant and his wife have a son named Ivan, at and the same time a foal is born in their stables. The merchant then orders the foal to be cared for until Ivan is old enough. Twelve years later, the merchant's wife dies and he remarries, while Ivan grows closer to the foal, which he names "Bratishka" and spends his days with him when he returns from school. One day, Ivan's father travels abroad to trade in goods, and his new wife begins to have an affair. Afraid of Ivan revealing their illicit liaison, the boy's stepmother conspires with her lover to kill him. The foal Bratishka warns Ivan of their attempts: first, they plan to give him a glass of poison, which he is to drop on the ground; next, they put poison on his bed, so he is to linger a bit in his studies. Ivan escapes both attempts, but the stepmother's lover realizes the horse is helping him, and they decide to kill the foal by placing poison in its rations. The horse asks for Ivan's help, who places new food for the animal. After the merchant returns, the stepmother feigns illness and asks for the blood of Ivan's foal as remedy. Ivan goes to talk to Bratishka in the stables, and is told of the situation. The foal asks Ivan to save him, by having the boy ask his father for a last ride on the horse around the garden. The next day, the merchant invites everyone for a feast in honor of the foal before it is sacrificed, and Ivan requests a last ride on the horse. Their plan works, and they ride away to another country. Bratishka advises Ivan to get some rags from a beggar and always answer "Ne znayu" to everyone, while it stays on the meadows. Ivan does as instructed, enters a nearby city and begins to be called "Neznaika", for the only words he can utter. The local king locks Neznaika in a cage and orders his daughters to feed him: Neznaika rejects the elder princesses's offer of food and breaks their plates, while he accepts the youngest's. Later, matchmakers and suitors come to court the princesses: the elder two find their husband, but the youngest chooses Neznaika. For this, a war erupts against the kingdom, started by a spurned suitor. The youngest princess goes to Neznaika and releases him so that he can fight to protect the kingdom: he is given a horse, but his foal Bratishka appears to him, turns him into a gallant knight and both ride to the battlefield. Still on the first day, Ivan meets his brothers-in-law before they go to fight the enemy army's champions, and asks them for their index fingers in exchange for defeating the foes by himself. A soldier stabs Ivan with a lance, injuring his leg, which is bandaged by the princess, and he returns to his lowly disguise. The battle goes on for another day, and on the third day, Ivan rides Bratishka again. He meets his brothers-in-law and asks for stripes of flesh cut off from their backs in exchange for letting him defeat the remaining enemies. It happens thus, Ivan defeats the army, and returns to his cage as Neznaika. A feast is given to celebrate their victory, and the king's sons-in-law boast about their victory. The youngest princess brings Neznaika with her to the feast, and he says the elder princesses' husbands should lift their shirts and take off their gloves to show their missing body parts, to reveal they never took part in the battle. The king discovers their ruse and banishes them. A doctor tends to Ivan, and sees the princess's kerchief on his leg, thus proving he was the knight at the battlefield. At the end of the tale, Ivan rules after his father-in-law, and Bratishka, before it dies, shares its wisdom with Ivan.

=== Terek Cossacks ===
In a tale from the Terek Cossacks titled "Незнайко" ("I Don't Know"), in a distant kingdom, king Mahommetan Mahommetanovich has 12 wives, but no son yet. The elders advise him to seek the Old Man Pirigrim. Pirigrim bids him send a scout to listen under people's windows for something at night. One night, the scout overhears the conversation between a poor man's 12 daughters, and they boast of the abilities, the youngest promising to bear 12 children to her husband. The king goes to the man's house to court the girl and after some years, they marry. However, the new queen does not bear any children, and she says Pirigrim can go to the market and buy some apples for them. The fruits are brought to the royal couple, who each eat half of an apple. In time, a son is born to them, named Mahommedan Mahommedanovich. The boy grows up, and one, day, the king has to depart on a mission, and leaves a general in charge of the realm. The general starts an affair with the queen in the king's absence, which the prince complains to his mother about. The general then conspires with the queen: he knows of a witch who can guide him on how to get rid of the prince. Meanwhile, the prince is told about his father's loyal horse, "Черный Вихорь" ("Chernyy Vikhor"), held in the basement of the castle for 30 years behind 12 locks and 12 iron doors. Back to the general, the witch advises him to kill the prince: first, they bake him a cake made of snake fat, which will poison the prince. The boy takes the dish and goes to meet Chernyy Vikhor, which warns him to toss the poisoned cake to the dogs, who eat it and die. Next, they brew him tea made of deadly leaves, which the horse advises him to drop. Thirdly, the witch gives the general a magic red shirt, to be delivered to the prince after he comes from the banya. The horse warns the prince the garment will turn him to cinders as soon as he puts it, and advises him to take a quick bath. Lastly, the witch divines on her magic book the boy is being helped by the horse, and advises the queen to rip her clothes and scream aloud, then tell her husband, after he returns, she had a vision in which she will only get better if she eats the heart and the liver of the king's horse. The king falls for her deception and prepares to sacrifice the horse. The prince goes to meet the horse and it warns him of the queen's deception, and asks the boy to save him by request a ride on it. As soon as he finishes, the soldiers appear and take the horse to be killed, but the prince begs his father for a single ride on his father's horse. The king allows it. After a 30 minute ride, the prince asks for a second, shorter ride, and the king indulges him. After a request for a last 10-minute ride, both prince and horse fly off to the thirtieth kingdom. The prince guides the horse with the reins, and finds shabby clothes on the road, which he pockets. After the stop, they ride to the kingdom of tsar Vareolomey, where the horse advises him to sprinkle a potion to attract some gnats to the king's room; this will draw the king's attention and he will see the prince, who is to always answer "ne znayu - tak i byli". It happens thus, and the tsar Vareolomey welcomes the boy, despite his strange mannerisms and getup. The stranger is placed in the kitchen as a helper, but he does not fit in, and is moved to the garden as an assistant. He tries to help in the garden, and ends up flaying a horse while trying to draw water. He is then moved to the orchard, where he excels at. Some time later, tsar Vareolomey is told about a foreign king who has declared war against him with an army larger than his own, but he only has six daughters. The youngest princess, however, notices that the gardener is more than it appears to be underneath the silly disguise, and advises her father to consult with him. The soldiers bring him to the king's presence, but he can only answer "ne znayu - tak i byli". Annoyed at the reply, the king orders him to be locked in the dungeons, and for his army to be ready for war. At the dungeons, the prince wishes he could have his horse by him, and Chernyy Vikhor appears just outside the dungeon. The prince breaks a wall, and talks to his horse about the upcoming conflict, then puts on his princely clothes and rides into war to help the kingdom. The prince appears at the battlefield, kills the enemies and goes to meet king Vareolomey, who thanks him for his bravery. The prince then rushes back to his dungeon cell and dismisses the horse, while he sleeps in his princely clothes. Back to the king, he holds a celebratory feast for three days in hopes of seeing the knight again. The youngest princess utters that the knight is their gardener, and for this, the king orders her to see their prisoner in the dungeons. Once there, she sees the knight, and informs the tsar. The monarch goes to check for himself and sees the knight, who is asleep. After a 12 days' rest, the prince wakes up and is guided to the feast in his honour. He fights some of the tsar's soldiers to prove he was the kingdom's saviour, and asks as a reward the youngest princess. The next day, the six princesses are dressed all alike, and the horse Chernyy Vikhor helps the prince to identify her, by shapeshifting into a fly and buzzing around her. Mahommedan Mahommedanovich marries the youngest princess.

=== Europe ===
==== Eastern Europe ====
===== Ukraine =====
In a Ukrainian tale collected by Pavlo Chubynskyi with the title "Про царевыча и его коня" ("About the prince and his horse") and sourced from Volyn, a queen gives birth to a son, and a mare foals a colt in the stables. The colt is given to the prince, and learns to talk. When the king departs for war, the queen begins an affair and decides to kill her own son to hide it. Unaware of this, the prince goes to talk with the horse in the stables, which warns him not to eat the breakfast hie mother prepared for him, and to throw it to a dog. The prince does as instructed and the dog eats it and dies. The queen tries it again with his dinner, but the horse advises the prince to dispose of the food to a dog. Failing that, the queen places a snake on the prince's bed to bite him in his sleep, which avoids by following the horse's instructions to only place his cloak on the bed. Since the king is returning the following day, the horse advises the prince to lock his doors and windows and shout to cause a commotion to draw the king's attention; then, the prince is to gather some clothes and money and ask to ride the horse around the patio, for they will take the chance to escape. The following day, the king returns and the prince for a ride on the horse around the patio. They soon jump over the fence and ride away to another kingdom. The horse advises the prince to don a lowly disguise, find work in the kingdom and always answer "Ne uznayu". The prince does as instructed and finds work as a gardener's assistant, and is called Neznaiko, for the only words he can utter. The local king's third daughter spots the new servant and takes an interest in him, first by giving him some flowers, then some coins, which he throws in a fire. As part of his gardening job, the prince ventures into the forest, summons his horse and restores a dried tree to life. Later, the king wishes to marry his twelve daughters, and summons all knights before the palace. Neznaiko goes to the gathering in front of the palace to see the commotion and the princess chooses him as her suitor, while her sisters choose fine knights and noblemen. The king marries his twelve daughters to their suitors, but expels the one that married Neznaiko to a humble hunt. Some time later, war erupts, and the king calls for his eleven sons-in-law to join him in battle. Neznaiko tells his wife he will fetch some firewood in the forest, but instead summons his horse and rides into battle to defeat his father-in-law's enemies, then returns home to his lowly disguise. The war goes on for some time, and Neznaiko rides into battle a second time on his loyal horse. Lastly, Neznaiko, under the guise of the mysterious knight, joins the battlefield a third time. The king gives his sons-in-law and the knight a kerchief. Neznaiko defeats the enemies, but is hurt in the hand. The king dresses his wound with his kerchef, and Neznaiko leaves the battlefield back home to rest. The princess goes to talk to her father and learns he wishes to meet their saviour, the mysterious knight with the injured hand. The princess returns home and notices her father's kerchief on Neznaiko, then goes to tell the king about it. The eleven sons-in-law mock her for the notion, but the king goes to check on it himself and confirms Neznaiko has the same type of kerchief given to the others at the battlefield. Neznaiko resumes his princely status, while the king banishes the other eleven sons-in-law and gives the kingdom to Neznaiko.

===== Croatia =====
In a Croatian language tale from Istria, collected by folklorist Maja Bošković-Stulli with the title Đovanin i konjić ("Dovanin and the Little Horse"), Dovanin is given a little horse. One day, while he is in the stables, the horse cries and warns the boy that his aunt intends to kill him by giving him cookies laced with poison, and later poisoned tea. With the horse's warnings, he avoids both dangers, and they both flee from home. At a distance, the horse advises the boy to answer everything only with the sentence "ne znan" ("I don't know"), and gives him its bridle which can summon it in case the boy needs any help. Dovanin goes to a nearby city and looks for a job with the king. The king's daughter, seeing his beauty, convinces her father to hire him as their gardener. While he is at work, the youth summons the horse and tramples the entire royal garden. The king learns of this and threatens to kill him, but, once again, the princess intervenes on his behalf. Some time later, the king summons his daughters' potential husbands, Dovanin included, and asks the latter to wait behind a door, while the two elder princesses gift their husbands, two princes, a golden apple and a silken ribbon. The youngest princess also gives her golden apple and silk ribbon to Dovanin. Later, the king summons his three sons-in-law to hunt some fowl in the woods. Dovanin rides behind his brothers-in-law on a lame horse, but, when he is out of sight, he summons his loyal horse and hunts fowl all around the woods. Soon after, the two princes find him and the large set of game. Without recognizing him and their brother-in-law, they ask the stranger to share some of the game; Dovanin agrees to a trade: some of the fowl in exchange for their golden apples. The princes return to the castle, and Dovanin not far behind, but with the best fowl. Some time later, war breaks out, and the king orders his sons-in-law to fight for the kingdom. Dovanin is given another lame horse - and is expected to die in battle, but ditches the shabby mount and summons his horse again. He rides into battle and defeats the enemy army, but is injured in his right leg. The princes bandage his injury, and Dovanin returns back to the lame ride, while the princes go directly to the castle for a celebratory feast. The two princes claim that Dovanin died in battle, but he soon enters the feast.

==== Caucasus Region ====
===== Georgia =====
East Slavic tale type 532 is reported in the Georgian Folktale Index, numbered 532, "I Don't Know": the hero is banished from home, but, with the help of a horse, arrives at another kingdom, where he finds work as the king's gardener and only answers "I don't know".

===== Adyghe people =====
East Slavic type SUS 532, Neznaiko, is also registered among the Adyghes. In the Adyghe tale type, the hero's stepmother, intent on harming her stepson, feigns illness and asks for his horse's blood as remedy. Wanting to protect both himself and his loyal horse, the hero escapes to another kingdom where, after heroic deeds, he marries the khan's daughter.

In an Adyghe tale collected by Adyghe educator Pago Tambiev and translated to Russian as "Нарун Незнайко" ("Narun Neznaiko"), a rich merchant takes his son to the steppes, when they find a dying foal of a bay colour in a meadow. The boy asks his father to bring the foal with them on their cart, and the boy takes care of the little animal until it regains its health and becomes a fine horse. One day, the boy discovers his mother has a lover, and leaves home on the horse to clear his thoughts. Thus, he decides to go back home, but his mother's lover, fearing they will be found out, convinces her to kill the horse: the woman feigns illness and asks for the blood of a horse of alp stock as cure, which just happens to be the son's pet horse. The merchant returns home and, told of his wife's illness, decide to sacrifice his son's horse. The boy goes to the stables to mourn for his horse, and the animal begins to speak and plans with the boy a last resort: the boy is to ask for a last ride on the animal and gallop away, but return in the dark of night to reveal the truth to his father, then depart definitively to another land. It happens thus, and boy and horse escape to a distant forest. Once there, the bay horse neighs and summons its elder brothers, a black horse, and a white one, and asks the boy to pluck some hairs from their tales to use in case he needs their help. As a final advice, the horse tells the boy to always answer "narun", and run in the direction of the local khan's garden, where he can be hired as its keeper. The horse and the boy part ways, and, doing as instructed, he enters the city and hires himself as the khan's gardenkeeper. That night, he (henceforth, "Narun") summons the black horse by burning its hairs and destroys the khan's garden. This happens twice more: with the white horse on the second night and the bay horse on the third one - events that are witnessed by the khan's youngest daughter, who falls in love with Narun. Wanting to marry him, but arranging for his elder sisters to be married first, the princess devises a plan: she orders a servant to harvest three cucumbers of varying ripeness and send them to the king as analogy to their marriageability. The plan works, and the khan decides to marry his daughters off at the same time: a grand festival is to be held for several days, people are to gather and the princesses are to choose their husbands by selecting a youth and giving them a cup to drink from. This happens to the two elder princesses, who choose fine husbands. The youngest princess tries to search for Narun on her turn, but cannot find him. The khan orders for everyone to be at the celebration, and they bring Narun. The youngest princess chooses poor Narun, to the khan's horror, who banishes her to a chicken coop. Later, war breaks out, and armies march to defend the city. Narun joins his father-in-law's army, but is given a lame horse. Narun then summons his horses, and they ride into battle each day: the first day, he is hurt in his hand, which the khan bandages. After the war, the king goes blind, and only deer milk can cure him. Narun summons his horse and rides into the wilderness, and finds the deer milk. Narun's brothers-in-law appear and do not recognize him, then ask for some deer milk. Narun agrees to a trade: deer milk (which Narun changes for mare's milk) in exchange for branding their buttocks with a sea. It happens thus, and the sons-in-law go back to the king to deliver the wrong milk. Narun delivers the correct one and cures the khan. The khan notices his own kerchief on Narun and realizes he was the knight at the battlefield. Narun then orders his brothers-in-law to show their marks, thus proving his story, and he is made the khan's successor. The tale has been compared to Russian "Neznaiko", for its resemblance of motifs (mother's persecution, talking horse helper, feigned ignorance and repetition of expression, hero's menial service as gardener).

==== Baltic region ====
===== Finland =====
Tale type 532 is known in Finland as En tiedä ("I Don't Know""), according to the Finnish Folktale Catalogue, established by scholar Pirkko-Liisa Rausmaa: the hero's stepmother wants to kill him, but he escapes with the help of a horse; he becomes a gardener to another king and always utters the expression "En tiedä" ("I don't know").

In a Finnish tale titled Das kluge Pferde ("The Clever Horse"), a king dies. His son, the prince, has a talking horse he inherited from his father. One day, the horse warns the prince that his brother's widow is trying to kill him: first, by poisoning an egg and his food, then lacing his clothes with poison. With the horse's warning, the prince avoids the danger, until the horse advises him to take some clothes and flee to another kingdom. They do. When they reach another kingdom, the horse advises the prince to trade his fine garments for shabby ones, buy a pig's bladder and wear it as a cap, and always utter the words "miesnai, miesnai". The prince follows his words, and goes to the king's castle, where he shouts "miesnai", so the people think he is a dumb person. The king decides to hire him as a pig-keeper, which he excels at. Some time later, the king announces that his daughter shall marry the one who can hunt him a golden-feathered black grouse, a golden-feathered hazel grouse, and a golden-furred squirrel. The prince joins in the hunt by ditching his pig-keeper disguise, and summons the horse to hunt the golden animals. The princess's other suitor finds him in the forest and asks if he can sell him the animals. The prince - whom the suitor does not recognize as the pig-keeper - agrees to sell him, in exchange for his little fingers. The suitor takes the animals to the princess and the wedding date is set. The princess visits the pig-keeper and questions him about his origins. The pig-keeper tells her everything and how he found the golden animals. The princess then convinces him to be her true husband. During the wedding, the prince comes with his horse and proves the suitor's deception by showing the little fingers. He then marries the princess.

===== Estonia =====
The Estonian Folktale Catalogue registers the episode of the treacherous stepmother and the hero's flight on the horse as the second introduction of tale type ATU 314, Hobune abiliseks ("The Horse as a Helper"): the hero escapes and finds work in another kingdom (as gardener or cook), and, depending on the variant, may always utter the word "nesnaaju" ('I don't know').

==== Southern Europe ====
In a tale from Mentone with the title The Little Mare, a widowed peasant has a mare he asks his son to take care of. He also remarries, and his new wife hates her step-son she plans to kill him: first by giving him some fritters laced with poison, then a cake. The boy's little mare warns the boy on both attempts, and is seen by the stepmother. She then plots with her doctor to feign illness and ask to be wrapped in the skin of a mare as her cure. The peasant's son escapes with the mare to another city, and the animal advises him to hide his golden hair under a kerchief and always utter the words "Bismé" to anything the people say. Bismé, as how he begins to be called, finds work as the royal gardener's assistant, and fashions beautiful bouquets for the king's three daughters, the youngest gaining the most exquisite of them. Later, the mare advises Bismé to take off the kerchief at midnight near the youngest princess's window, so she can see his bright golden hair shining in the distance. It happens thus, and the youngest princess falls in love with the gardener Bismé. She longs for him, and chooses him as her husband. The king agrees to their union, but banishes her from the castle to live a poor gardener's life, unlike her sisters, who married princes. Later, war breaks out, and the king's sons-in-law join in the fray, the two princes in fine horses and Bismé on a lame mule. When he is out of sight, the little mare appears before Bismé and they ride to battle, defeat the enemy army and take the banners of war with them. Next, the two princes go on a hunt to catch some game, and meet Bismé in fine clothes, but do not recognize him. They ask for some game, and Bismé agrees, as long as they give him their wedding rings. The next day, the princes ask again for more game, and Bismé agrees, as long as they allow to be branded on their rumps. Finally, the king prepares a grand feast to celebrate the kingdom's victory, and the two princes boast about their prowess in war and in the hunt. Bismé then talks about how he got the banners of war, and the price he asked of his brothers-in-law for the game. The king banishes the two princes from the kingdom and names Bismé his heir.

===== Bulgaria =====
Tale type AaTh 532 is reported in the Bulgarian Folktale Catalogue with the name "Чудесният кон (Незнаян)" or "Das Zauberpferd (Neznajan)" ("The Magic Horse"): the hero's stepmother tries to kill him, but the hero's horse warns him against her attempts, so she feigns illness and asks for the horse's heart (or the hero's blood); the hero escapes to another kingdom, where he finds work as a king's gardener, the king's daughters choose their husbands, and the youngest chooses the gardener; later, the hero summons his horse by burning its hairs and fights the king's enemies and fetches him a remedy.

===== Albania =====
Slavicist André Mazon, in his study on Balkan folklore, collected an Albanian language tale he translated as Le Poulain-Magique ("The Magic Colt"), from a teller named Poliksena Kuneškova. In this tale, a king and a queen have a son. Soon after, the queen dies and the king remarries, but his new wife hates her step-son and plans to kill him: first, by mixing poison in his food; next, putting poison on the stairs. The prince is warned of the attempts on his life by his friend, the colt. Later, the stepmother feigns illness and asks for the heart of a magic colt as a cure. The horse tells the prince of his stepmother's plan: she will have the horse killed first, then the boy himself, but they can escape; the boy is to ask his father for a silver armour, a sack of money, and for one last ride on the animal before it is executed. Their plan works without a hitch, and the prince flees on the horse away from his kingdom. They reach the outskirts of a city; the horse says it will keep the money they brought with them, and advises the prince to find a job, and gives him three hairs which can summon it. The prince enters the city, buys from a shepherd his clothes, and begins to wander the city shouting "bylmem!" ("Je ne sais", in Mazon's translation. English: "I don't know"). Some time later, the local king sets a suitor selection test for his three daughters: every available suitor shall pass by the palace door, and the princesses are to throw a golden apple to her husbands of choice. The two elder princesses throws theirs, but the youngest withholds hers until the shepherd passes by the castle and she throws him her golden apple. The king refuses to accept a lowly man as his son-in-law, but the princess insists on her choice, so the king marries them off and places them in a room at the back of the castle. Later, war breaks out with a neighbouring king, and the shepherd rides into battle on his horse and defeats the enemy army, taking the banners of war as proof of victory. The princess's father rejoices in their victory, but notices that the banners from the enemy army are missing. The youngest princess, following her husband's request, goes to her mother and pretends that her husband is gravelly ill, and begs her mother to accompany her to their room: the queen sees the shepherd in silver armour - the same armour the knight wore at the battlefield. The king recognizes the worth of his son-in-law and nominates him as his successor.

=== Asia ===
==== Kazakhstan ====
In a Kazakh tale titled Hanşa men Balası, translated to Turkish as Padişah ile Çocuğu ("Padishah and his Son"), to Russian as "Незнайка" ("I Don't Know") and to Hungarian as Nemtudomka ("I Don't Know"), a khan notices that his white mare is missing. His herdsman finds the mare on the lake shore next to a tulpar, and brings the animal home. Some time later, the mare gives birth to a foal, which the khan's son takes great interest in, knowing of the foal's parentage. Later, when the khan goes on a hunt, his wife, the khansha, is approached by a lover and convinced to kill her own son. First, they try to poison his surpa dish; next, try to give him roasted meat laced with poison. The khan's son is warned against the danger by the horse. Knowing that the horse is helping him, the khansha's lover convinces her to feign illness and ask for meat of a tulpar - which just happens to be pedigree of the khan's son's pet horse. The horse tells the khan's son of his mother's plot, and says it will neigh three times the next day to alert the boy. It happens so: the next day, the khan's son stops the execution and asks for on last ride on the horse. He mounts it and gallops away from his homeland. At a safe distance, the boy takes a hair from his tulpar horse, doffs his fine garments and wears a shepherd's disguise. He then reaches a city gates, and, when inquired by the guards, always utters the words "ne znayu" ("I do not know") to anything people ask of him. He is brought to the king and keeps repeating the sentence to him, to great annoyance. The king orders his execution, but the viziers convince him to spare the stranger and employ him as the gardener. Neznaika - his new appellation - begins to work in the garden: he utters a magic word to raze the garden to the ground, then utters the same spell to plant beautiful trees. Later, the king's three daughters bring melons to their father as analogy to their marriageability, so the king sets a suitor selection test: the princesses are to climb up a minaret and throw an apple to their husbands of choice among the jigits and other people. The elder two throw theirs, while the youngest withdraws hers until Neznaika is brought to the assemblage, and she finally throws hers. The king feels insulted by her choice and banishes his youngest daughter and Neznaika to a donkey pen. Later, the king orders his elder sons-in-law to hunt him some meat from a mountain goat. Neznaika joins in the hunt riding on a lame horse, but, when he is out of sight, he summons his tulpar horse, dons fine clothes and rides to the steppe and hunts a mountain goat. With the magic command, the boy curses the goat's meat to be bitter-tasting, but the entrails very sweet. The sons-in-law find him and ask him for the meat. Three days later, the sons-in-law hunt again; Neznaika rides before them and, uttering a magic word, materializes a cattle pen. Neznaika's brothers-in-law come to the cattle and ask him for some goat meat. Neznaika - which they don't recognize - agrees to give them some, in exchange for them having a "tamga" (a mark, a sign) on their backs. At the end of the tale, Neznaika appears to his father-in-law as the khan's son he is, and demands his two slaves, his brothers-in-law.

==== Uyghur people ====
In an Uyghur tale collected from informant Qurban Qasim, in Lopnur, with the title Niznay (Turkish: "Niznay"; English: "Niznay"), a prince succeeds his father when the Islamic faith was newly introduced to the world, becomes sultan, marries a woman and fathers a son. The wife dies on childbirth, but a colt appears by the ruler's gate when the young son is born. The sultan interprets this as a sign that his son will be special. The colt is brought in; it does not eat grass, not drink water, but can speak. The new king's son goes to school and plays with the colt when he returns from school. The king marries another woman per the people's recommendation, but keeps showing affection to his son. The new queen dislikes how the king dotes on his son, and worries that, if she ever bears a child of her own, the first son would be favoured over her child. Thus she decides to kill the prince. She consults with a witch, and both dig up a pit in the threshold, fill it with iron spikes and place a thin plank of wood. This time, when the sultan is away, the prince visits the foal and notices it is crying, since the boy is destined to die, and if the boy dies, the foal will depart this world. The foal then advises him to jump over the threshold and tell the queen his teacher wished him to do so. It happens thus, and he avoids the danger. Next, the woman plans to poison the prince once the sultan is away on another hunt, by lacing some poison in the tea. The prince visits his foal friend and finds him in tears, since another danger awaits him: the poisoned tea, which the queen will serve from a teapot reserved for him, so he is to distract the queen and his father by pointing to a place on the wall and swap the poisoned teacup with the queen's so that she dies by imbibing it. The prince goes to join his stepmother and father for tea, does as the horse instructed by asking what is there in the ceiling vent, and exchanges the cups. The queen notices the change, but serves another cup for herself. After the Sultan leaves, the witch reveals to the queen that she must kill the horse first before killing the prince, so she feigns illness and bribes doctors with gold for them to say she is ill and needs the heart of the prince's foal in the stables. The Sultan returns home, sees his wife in such a sorry state, and falls for her deception after being tricked by the doctors that she is under a spell and only by sacrificing the horse she can be healed. The Sultan worries about the foal which befriended his son, but orders the guards to hold the prince at school the following morning. The following morning, the prince pays a visit to his friend and finds it in tears; the horse then reveals it will die today, so they hatch a plan to avoid this fate: the foal will neigh three times to alert the prince while he is in school (madrasa), and he is to ask for a last ride on it with his father's kaftan.

The following morning, the horse neighs to alert the prince, who leaves the madrasa through the window and rushes to aid his friend, by asking his father one last ride on the horse. The sultan aquiesces with his request, and lets him ride the horse around the city with a golden saddle. The prince rides the horse to the gates of the city, when the horse developes wings on its side, becomes a tulpar and flies off with the prince. The Sultan gets news of this and laments for his son's vanishing, then suspects this was the work of the witch-woman and executes his wife by quartering. Back to the prince, it lands in another country. The tulpar advises the prince to go beyond a mountain, find a bald young shepherd, kill him, skin him and wear his hide on his head, and herd the sheep; as he rests by water in the garden, the local sultan will see him and ask his name, which he is to reply only with "Niznay". The prince follows the tulpar's instructions, kills the shepherd and wears his scalp on his head. The sultan sees him, learns his name is Niznay, and bids him work in his garden. As he works in the garden, he rides his tulpar horse on Thursdays without the lowly disguise, and returns to the garden. One Thursday, the youngest princess is sitting by the royal pavilion, when she sees Niznay going into the orchard. She follows him the other day and finds him without his disguise and riding around the tulpar, then wishes him to become her bridegroom. She convinces her father, the padishah to enter the orchard and eat some of the fruits. They summon Niznay to fetch them apples, and he brings three of varying quality: a rotten one for the elder one, a half-rotten one for the middle one, and a fresh one for the youngest. The princesses bring the apples to their father in a leather bag and the padishah correctly interprets their meaning: it is past time to marry the princesses. Thus, the padishah tells the princesses to take these apples and throw them at the assembly of young men that he will gather the following morning, for them to marry whoever their apples hit.

The following morning, suitors gather to try their luck with the chance of becoming the padishah's son-in-law. The eldest princess throws her to a wealthy merchant, the middle one to a unemployed young man, and the youngest withholds hers. The padishah learns of this, and someone mentions there is the bald gardener Niznay. They bring him to pass by the portico and the youngest princess throws her apple to him. The padishah marries all three in a grand celebration, and her elder sisters mock their cadette, who complains to her husband why he cannot show his true face. Niznay assuages her that he will soon show his true face and her sisters will bow before her. Sometime later, a dragon comes from the mountains to menace the kingdom, since he eats a person per day, lest it destroys the city. Thus, the lot falls on the eldest princess this time. Niznay hears the city weeping, learns of the sacrifices to the dragon, and is convinced by his wife to save the eldest princess. Niznay enters the orchard, rattles the reins to summon his steed, dons armour, sword and shield and goes to meet his sister-in-law to save her. The dragon appears, devours Niznay, who cuts it up from the inside, causing one half of the monster to fall on one side and become a mountain and the other to fall on the other side and become a bridge. He fashions a frame of the dragon's intestines using poplar roots, and asks the eldest princess to deliver it to her father, then takes her back to the city. Niznay returns to his wife, who notices her sister's handkerchief on his arm, but he dismisses the idea.

The youngest princess goes to the main house and is expelled by her eldest sister, mocking her choice of the bald gardener. The princess complains again, but Niznay promises her he will reveal his true form after he completes all of the padishah's trials. Sometime later, the padishah wants to eat some meat, and sends his sons-in-law to go hunting for some. Niznay takes his tulpar horse, which looked like a lame mount, and is mocked by his brothers-in-law. They take separate routes to hunt apart. Niznay rides to a mountain, sees some thirty camels, and utters a pray to Allah for his arrow to shoot them at once, and for their insides to be sweet and their meat bitter. He kills the thirty camels and tastes their insides. As he is eating a liver, he is approaches by his brothers-in-law, who do not recognize him and ask for some camel meat. Niznay spins a story that he is visiting some graves on the mountain, but agrees to a deal: the camel meat in exchanging for branding their thighs with a mark saying they are his slaves. A deal is struck, and the brothers-in-law suffer their branding and return home with the camel meat, while Niznay returns to his lowly disguise and brings his wife the heads, the trotters and the offals of the camels. The following day, Niznay tells his wife that the camel meat the brothers-in-law will serve will be inedible. The sons-in-law host the padishah in their houses, and the padishah eats the camel meat, but finds it too spicy and rebukes his sons-in-law. He then pays a visit to Niznay and is served the camel heads and trotters, finding them delicious. Later, the youngest princess confronts Niznay about still hiding his identity, so Niznay goes to his tulpar horse for advice. The tulpar says that it is not yet time, but the prince can meet the padishah during the ablutions at the palace. The prince appears before the padishah and calls him father, since he is Niznay, his son-in-law and the youngest princess's husband. The padishah is incredulous at first, so he summons forty warriors, places Niznay at the back and bids his cadette identify her husband. The youngest princess points to Niznay, calls him the son of Miñkü Batur, padishah of seventy-two thousand realms, thus confirming his story. The local padishah realizes his son-in-law is of superior rank and gives him a seat of honour in the grand banquet. Niznay also admits he was the one to hunt the camels, and bids him summon his brothers-in-law to show their brandmarks. The eldest princess also recognizes Niznay as her saviour. Niznay then builds a forty-story mansion for his wife to keep her away from his brothers-in-law's prying looks.

=== America ===
Professor Alcée Fortier collected a Louisiana Creole tale titled Give Me: a woman, already married, does not have any child. One day, she sees an apple-seller with a basket of fruits on her head, and wishes to buy one. The apple-seller says she knows the woman wants to have a child, and gives her an apple. The woman eats the apple and discards the peels, which are eaten by a mare. The woman gives birth to a boy and the mare to a colt during the night. The woman gives the little horse to her son, since they were born at the same time, and they become great friends. Some time later, the boy wants to see the world, and rides away to another country where a king lives in a beautiful house. He dismounts his horse (which the story explains it is magical), wears beggar clothes and goes to the king's kitchen. He only utters the words "Give me" to anything the people say, and the king's servants think he is an idiot, but let him stay in the kitchen. On one Sunday, the king goes to church for mass, and leaves his daughter there. Thinking no one is at the castle, Give Me summons his magic horse and rides around the garden, trampling the flowers - an event witnessed by the princess, who falls in love with him. The king goes back home and, seeing the destroyed garden, asks Give Me if he saw anything. This happens on the following Sunday, until, on the third Sunday, the king decides to stay home to investigate the culprit: he sees Give Me on the horse galloping around the garden in princely clothes. The king questions Give Me, who tells about his life story and shows him the magic horse. The king then marries the youth to the princess. Fortier supposed that the tale may have had an "Oriental" origin. In the Catalogue of French Folktales, French scholars Paul Delarue and Marie-Louise Thèneze classify the tale as type 314, "Le Petit Jardinier aux Cheveux d'Or ou Le Teigneux" ("The Golden-Haired Little Gardener, or the Scaldhead").

== See also ==
- The Black Colt
- The Magician's Horse
- Little Johnny Sheep-Dung
- The Gifts of the Magician
- Făt-Frumos with the Golden Hair
- Iron Hans
- Fire Boy (folktale)
- En Mercè-Mercè
- Bogatyr Neznay
- The Enchanted Hinny
