= The King's Son with the Star on the Front =

Albanian tale

The King's Son with the Star on the Front (Albanian: Djali i Mbretit me Yll në Ballë) is an Albanian tale collected in Tërstenik, Drenicë. It is classified in the international Aarne-Thompson-Uther Index as ATU 314, "Goldener". It deals with a friendship between a king's son and a magic horse that are forced to flee for their lives due to the boy's stepmother, and reach another kingdom, where the boy adopts another identity.

Although it differs from variants wherein a hero acquires golden hair, its starting sequence (persecution by the hero's stepmother) is considered by scholarship as an alternate opening to the same tale type.

== Source ==
The tale was collected from an informant named Ramadan Gjoka, from Tërstenik, Drenicë.

== Summary ==
In this tale, a king has a son with a star on his forehead, and a foal with a moon on the body. The prince and the foal are friends and treat each other as brothers. One day, the king remarries to give the prince a new mother, but the new queen despises her stepson and tries to kill him by poisoning his food with iron. The prince goes to meet his foal friend, which can talk, before his meals, and the foal warns the prince about the danger in the food, so he is to throw it to a cat to see it for himself. It happens thus, and the cat eats it and dies. The queen tries to poison the prince's food a few times more, but is foiled by the foal's intervention. She discovers the animal is helping the stepson prince, feigns illness and asks for the foal's heart as remedy. The prince learns of this and goes to talk to the foal, which hatches a counterplan: the prince is to ask the king to buy some clothes, a cloak, a saddle, a bridle, shoes and ducats, then he is to request for a last ride on the foal before its killing. The following morning, the king prepares to sacrifice the foal, when the prince puts the equine's plan in action. After being properly equipped, the prince rides the horse away from his father's kingdom.

Further away, the prince alights the horse near a village where an old man works as the local king's gardener. The foal advises the prince to put on other clothes and the princely garments on his back, and burn some hairs of its mane to summon it should the need arise, then departs. The prince takes shelter with the old man gardener and learns to make wreaths and bouquets for the princesses. The girls take notice of the gardener's handsome new assistant and pay him some liras, which he gives to the old gardener. One night, the old man asks his new assistant to look after the garden, while he takes some flowers to his wife. In his absence, the prince summons his horse friend for a ride around the garden. The king's third daughter sees a light coming from the garden and finds the gardener's assistant in kingly garments, riding on the horse, then donning the lowly garments and dismissing his mount. The old gardener returns and finds the garden destroyed, which his assistant attributes to some escaping horses from the king's barns.

Some time later, the king organizes a suitor selection for the princesses: they are to ride around the village on a horse with an apple in hand and throw it to their suitors of choice. The elder two princesses choose the sadriezim, while the third princess withholds hers. The people take notice of the absent gardener and his assistant, and the third princess rides her horse towards them, throwing her apple at the young assistant's direction, who picks it up. The king is dissatisfied with this turn of events and asks her to throw it again, and again she throws it at the lowly assistant, and a third time, falling on him again. The king is unhappy with this arrangement, but marries his cadette and places her in a humble hut out of his sight. The cadette princess confesses to her lowly husband she chose to be with him, to which he replies he is no bridegroom suitable for a princess, but the princess remains steadfast in her decision.

Some time later, the king grows blind, and the doctors cannot force him to open his eyes. The king's sons-in-law, the sadriezins and the gardener's assistant, are summoned to find him a remedy. The lowly gardener is given a lame horse from the stables, while his brothers-in-law take stronger mounts and almost run him over. Out of their sight, the prince summons his loyal foal and rides to the wilderness with a bottle to fetch the cure. The prince enters a meadow of wild mares and their protector, a stallion, which his foal battles against. The prince takes a bottle of the milk and returns with his loyal foal next to the place where he left his lame mount, just in time to see his brothers-in-law returning from a failed quest. The sadriezins spot the bottle on the gardener's assistant's hands and deduce he has the king's remedy, so they move to kill him. However, the prince makes a deal with them: he will surrender the bottle in exchange for marking their shoulders with a knife. A deal is made and the two sadriezins return to the king's palace with the cure, which they apply on his eyes. The king is surprised to regain his sight and thanks his two sons-in-law, then thinks of killing his cadette and her poor husband. He confronts his daughter and her husband, who points to the saziedrins and mentions the scars he left on their bodies when he gave them the medicine. The king confirms the gardener's assistant's story, orders the execution of the two sons-in-law and nominates the gardener's assistant as his new saziedrim. The prince then doffs his lowly disguise, summons his horse and takes a ride around the city.

== Analysis ==
=== Tale type ===
The collector described the tale as belonging "partially" to type ATU 303, "The Twins or Blood Brothers". It is classified in the international Aarne-Thompson-Uther Index as type ATU 314, "The Goldener": a youth with golden hair works as the king's gardener. The type may also open with the prince for some reason being the servant of an evil being, where he gains the same gifts, and the tale proceeds as in this variant.

==== Introductory episodes ====
Scholarship notes three different opening episodes to the tale type: (1) the hero becomes a magician's servant and is forbidden to open a certain door, but he does and dips his hair in a pool of gold; (2) the hero is persecuted by his stepmother, but his loyal horse warns him and later they both flee; (3) the hero is given to the magician as payment for the magician's help with his parents' infertility problem. Folklorist Christine Goldberg, in Enzyklopädie des Märchens, related the second opening to former tale type AaTh 532, "The Helpful Horse (I Don't Know)", wherein the hero is persecuted by his stepmother and flees from home with his horse. (Note: According to Stith Thompson's 1961 revision of the index, in type 532 the hero's helpful horse advises him to answer every question with the sentence "I don't know".)

American folklorist Barre Toelken recognized the spread of the tale type across Northern, Eastern and Southern Europe, but identified three subtypes: one that appears in Europe (Subtype 1), wherein the protagonist becomes the servant to a magical person, finds the talking horse and discovers his benefactor's true evil nature, and acquires a golden colour on some part of his body; a second narrative (Subtype 3), found in Greece, Turkey, Caucasus, Uzbekistan and Northern India, where the protagonist is born through the use of a magical fruit; and a third one (Subtype 2). According to Toelken, this Subtype 2 is "the oldest", being found "in Southern Siberia, Iran, the Arabian countries, Mediterranean, Hungary and Poland". In this subtype, the hero (who may be a prince) and the foal are born at the same time and become friends, but their lives are at stake when the hero's mother asks for the horse's vital organ (or tries to kill the boy to hide her affair), which motivates their flight from their homeland to another kingdom.

According to Germanist Gunter Dammann, tale type 314 with the opening of hero and horse fleeing home extends from Western Himalaya and South Siberia, to Iran and the Arab-speaking countries in the Eastern Mediterranean. In addition, scholar Hasan El-Shamy stated that type 314 is "widely spread throughout north Africa", among Arabs and Berbers; in sub-Saharan Africa, as well as in Arabia and South Arabia.

=== Motifs ===
Professor Anna Birgitta Rooth stated that the motif of the stepmother's persecution of the hero appears in tale type 314 in variants from Slavonic, Eastern European and Near Eastern regions. She also connected this motif to part of the Cinderella cycle, in a variation involving a male hero and his cow.

==== Quest for the remedy ====
A motif that appears in tale type 314 is the hero having to find a cure for the ailing king, often the milk of a certain animal (e.g., a lioness). According to scholar Erika Taube, this motif occurs in tales from North Africa to East Asia, even among Persian- and Arabic-speaking peoples. Similarly, Hasan M. El-Shamy noted that the quest for the king's remedy appears as a subsidiary event "in the Arab-Berber culture area". In addition, Germanist Gunter Dammann, in Enzyklopädie des Märchens, noted that the motif of the quest for the remedy appeared "with relative frequency" in over half of the variants that start with the Subtype 2 opening (stepmother's persecution of hero and horse).

==== Branding the brothers-in-law ====
According to German scholars Günther Damman and Kurt Ranke, another motif that appears in tale type ATU 314 is the hero branding his brothers-in-law during their hunt. Likewise, Ranke stated that the hero's branding represented a mark of his ownership over his brothers-in-law.

Ranke located the motif in the Orient and in the Mediterranean. In the same vein, Hungarian professor Ákos Dömötör, in the notes to tale type ATU 314 in the Hungarian National Catalogue of Folktales (MNK), remarked that the motif was a "reflection of the Eastern legal custom", which also appears in the Turkic epic Alpamysh.

== Variants ==
=== Bilmesi ===
In an Albanian tale titled Bilmesi, a king has a son. After his wife dies, he remarries, and his new wife does not give him heirs. The prince is eighteen years old, is taught the language of horses and is gifted one by his father, the king. One day, the new queen cooks some fried eggs with medicine for the prince. The prince goes to talk to the foal before school and the foal answers him, warning the queen has prepared his food dowsed with medicine, so he should eat only the dry bread. When he goes to his meal, the queen questions the prince why he is not touching the eggs, and he lies that his teacher told him to eat the dry bread. Next, the queen extends from the door to the hearth a carpet dowsed with poison for the prince to step on and be poisoned. The foal warns the prince of the queen's second attempt, and advises him not to enter home. The prince jump and avoids stepping on the carpet, saying that the teacher told him to. The queen notices that her stepson goes to talk with the foal, then sets her sights to kill the animal: she feigns illness and asks for teh meat of a foal as remedy. The royal doctors assure she has a fever, and the king decides to ask his son about the foal. The foal overhears the conversation and cries to the prince that they plan to kill it, as part of his stepmother's plans. The prince enters the palace and asks his father about the queen's mysterious illness, and agrees to let the king sacrifice the horse, but he wants to take a ride on the horse after it is properly saddled and given golden horseshoes. As soon as the prince climbs on his foal friend, he bids his father good health and gallops away.

At another kingdom, the prince alights the horse, dons some old clothes and a cap to hide his identity. The foal gives the prince three hairs for him to burn and obtain beautiful garments: a white hair will grant him a sky-coloured garment, a red one will bring him a garment dotted with beautiful flowers, and a yellow one will grant him a vestment with the fishes of the sea. The horse departs, and the prince goes to look for a job. He finds the royal gardener and works with the melon orchard. The local king has three daughters, the youngest eighteen, the middle one twenty and the eldest twenty-two. The youngest comes to her window and the prince falls in love with her. He summons his horse, dons a sky-coloured outfit and runs around the garden. The princess sees him and decides she shall have the knight as her husband. The prince dismisses the horse and returns to his lowly disguise. The king goes to check the garden, finds it destroyed and questions the gardener's assistant, who can only say "Bilmes, Bilmes". The princess vouches for the assistant and lies that some five or six horses came in. She sits on the balcony all day and sees the prince destroy the garden a second time on the horse and in beautfiful clothes. For the second time, the princess lies that some dogs came in and trampled the garden, while the prince, as the gardener's assistant, replies with "Bilmes, Bilmes". The third time when the prince tramples the garden, the princess lies that a cow and five bulls came in and trampled the garden.

Eventually, the garden grows beautiful and the pasha and the vizier ask the gardener's assistant to bring some melons. He brings them some rotten melons, which the pasha and the vizier complain about and ask for better ones. He brings some good ones, but the duo insist on having the best ones. The gardener's assistant brings the last melons and explains it to the king that they are an analogy to the princesses' marriagebility: the eldest is past the age of marriage, the middle one a bit older, and the youngest just in time. Thus, the king orders for the army to bring suitors from all around the kingdom for the princesses to throw apples at their suitors of choice: the eldest throws her to the vizier's son, the middle one to the pasha's son, and the youngest to the gardener's assistant, to the people's mockery. The king marries the elder two in rich celebrations, and moves the youngest to live in a farm with the gardener's assistant.

Sometime later, war breaks out, and the king departs for war. The gardener's assistant doffs his lowly disguise, dons colorful garments and goes to fight in the war to help his father-in-law. The king ties a scarf on the mysterious knight, who departs back to the goose farm. Next, the king becomes blind and with sore eyes. The doctors prescribe the milk of wild mares as remedy. The king decides to send his two sons-in-law, but the prince (as the gardener's assistant) also offers to go on. His mount becomes stuck in the mud, while his brothers-in-law pass by him and mock him. While they are away, the prince summons his loyal foal, dons the sky garment and rides to meet the old man that herds the wild mares. The prince pays two gold coins to the old man to let him replace the herd and fill the jugs with river water for his brothers-in-law. His brothers-in-law appear and ask for some milk of wild mares. The prince, in disguise, offers a deal: the milk in exchange for branding their bodies with a hot horseshoe. The brothers-in-law depart, while the prince returns to his lame mount stuck in the mud to keep up appearances. The sons-in-law return with the wrong remedy and cannot cure the king. The youngest princess goes to talk to her father and says her husband her the right milk for his eyes. The sons-in-law scoff at the idea, since they saw him stuck in the mud. Still, the princess dowses a cloth with the mares' milk and wipes her father's eyes, curing him. The gardener's assistant is there when the king opens his eyes, and admits he saved his life in the battlefield. The king doubts his claim, but the prince tells him to watch from the window: the prince summons his foal, rides around the palace three times and shows the scarf the king gave him.

== See also ==
- The Prince and the Foal
- The Black Colt
- Donotknow
- The Story of the Prince and His Horse
- The Stallion Houssan
