= The Black Foal =

Folktale from Afghanistan

The Black Foal (French: Le Poulain noir) is a folktale from Afghanistan published by Ré Soupault and Philippe Soupault. It deals with a friendship between a sultan's son and a magic horse that are forced to flee for their lives due to the boy's step-mother, and reach another kingdom, where the prince adopts another identity.

It is classified in the international Aarne-Thompson-Uther Index as ATU 314, "Goldener". Although it differs from variants wherein a hero acquires golden hair, its starting sequence (persecution by the hero's stepmother) is considered by scholarship as an alternate opening to the same tale type. Similar tales are known across the Middle East and were collected in Afghanistan.

== Summary ==
In this tale, the son of a sultan loses his mother when he is three years old, and the sultan decides to remarry to give the boy a mother. However, the woman begins to hate her stepson. When the prince is fourteen years old, the sultan gifts him a black foal which he visits after school to pet and feed sweets to. The stepmother hates her stepson even more due to the boy's affection for the foal, and sends a favourite slave around town to bribe the doctors, so that they say that the sultana is ill and needs to eat the flesh of a black foal as remedy. To give credence to the lie, the sultana dyes her skin with yellow dye and places some bread under her body to appear as if her bones are breaking. The sultan is told by the doctors the sultana is ill and needs the flesh of the black foal, which puts the sultan in a dilemma. However, he decides to sacrifice his son's pet foal and orders the teacher to hold the boy longer at school the following morning.

As for the prince, he returns from school and goes to talk to the horse, which is crying bitter tears and refuses to eat his rations, then explains the sultana is feigning illness and that the sultan ordered its sacrifice. The foal then tells the prince they plan to hold him at school, but it will neigh three times to alert him, and he is to come to its aid and hold onto its back, for it will take both to safety. The following morning, the prince is at school, when he hears the horse neigh, and asks his teacher to be dismissed. On being scolded, the prince hears the third neigh, throws a brazier full of coals at his teacher's face and rushes back to the palace to stop the execution. The prince asks his father to be allowed one ride on the foal, and the sultan indulges his son. The prince saddles his horse with a diamond saddle, rides around the palace twice and, on the third time, rides the foal through the skies away from the palace.

The foal lands near a garden and tells the prince it cannot stay with him, but gives him four hairs of its mane which he can use to summon it, then departs. The prince hides his garments and saddle, wears a ram's skin on his head and finds work as the gardener's assistant to the local sultan. The sultan has seven daughters, the youngest the most intelligent and beautiful of them. On one hot day, the prince burns a hair of his foal to summon him, takes a bath in the river, dons his princely garments and rides around the garden three times. The local sultan's youngest daughter watches the event from her window and notices his beauty and grace, which he hides under the lowly gardener's assistant's disguise.

In time, the local sultan decides that it is time his daughters are married, and assembles a crowd of eligible suitors for the princesses to choose their husbands by throwing an orange to their suitors of choice. The elder chooses the vizier's son, the second eldest an emir's son, and the others sons of lords, while the youngest princess withholds hers, since she cannot find the gardener's assistant. The sultan orders that his soldiers bring whoever is absent, and they bring the lowly assistant, to whom the youngest princess throws her orange, signifying her choice. The sultan is enraged his cadette chose a lowly husband, and moves her out of the palace.

Some months later, the king falls ill, and the doctors prescribe gazelle meat as the remedy. The six sons-in-law ride into the wilderness to find any gazelle, to no avail. As for the prince, he burns the last hair of the mane of his foal, which bids him prepare for the hunt since it will group the gazelles near a tent. The brothers-in-law approach the tent and meet a prince surrounded by gazelles, who is the gardener they do not recognize. The brothers-in-law ask for some gazelle meat and the prince agrees to a deal: the meat in exchange for them being branded like slaves with hot iron. The brothers-in-law ponder a bit and agree to his terms, then take the meat, while the prince keeps the heads.

The sultan eats the meat from the gazelle carcasses, but cannot regain his health. The prince prepares a broth with the gazelle heads to be given to the sultan, who refuses to eat it at first. After some convincing by his wife, the sultan eats it and his health improves. The following morning, the sultan receives news that a prince has come to fetch his runaway slaves. The sultan says there are no slaves there, save for his six sons-in-law. The group enter the room and the prince points them as his slaves. The sons-in-law show their backs with the slave marks, proving the prince's claims. Soon, the sultan's youngest daughter appears and points to the prince as her master and husband. The sultan learns of the whole story and places his turban on the prince's head, marking him as his successor.

== Analysis ==
=== Tale type ===
The tale is classified in the Aarne-Thompson-Uther Index as type ATU 314, "The Goldener": a youth with golden hair works as the king's gardener. The type may also open with the prince for some reason being the servant of an evil being, where he gains the same gifts, and the tale proceeds as in this variant.

==== Introductory episodes ====
Scholarship notes three different opening episodes to the tale type: (1) the hero becomes a magician's servant and is forbidden to open a certain door, but he does and dips his hair in a pool of gold; (2) the hero is persecuted by his stepmother, but his loyal horse warns him and later they both flee; (3) the hero is given to the magician as payment for the magician's help with his parents' infertility problem. Folklorist Christine Goldberg, in Enzyklopädie des Märchens, related the second opening to former tale type AaTh 532, "The Helpful Horse (I Don't Know)", wherein the hero is persecuted by his stepmother and flees from home with his horse. (Note: According to Stith Thompson's 1961 revision of the index, in type 532 the hero's helpful horse advises him to answer every question with the sentence "I don't know".)

American folklorist Barre Toelken recognized the spread of the tale type across Northern, Eastern and Southern Europe, but identified three subtypes: one that appears in Europe (Subtype 1), wherein the protagonist becomes the servant to a magical person, finds the talking horse and discovers his benefactor's true evil nature, and acquires a golden colour on some part of his body; a second narrative (Subtype 3), found in Greece, Turkey, Caucasus, Uzbekistan and Northern India, where the protagonist is born through the use of a magical fruit; and a third one (Subtype 2). According to Toelken, this Subtype 2 is "the oldest", being found "in Southern Siberia, Iran, the Arabian countries, Mediterranean, Hungary and Poland". In this subtype, the hero (who may be a prince) and the foal are born at the same time and become friends, but their lives are at stake when the hero's mother asks for the horse's vital organ (or tries to kill the boy to hide her affair), which motivates their flight from their homeland to another kingdom.

=== Motifs ===
Professor Anna Birgitta Rooth stated that the motif of the stepmother's persecution of the hero appears in tale type 314 in variants from Slavonic, Eastern European and Near Eastern regions. She also connected this motif to part of the Cinderella cycle, in a variation involving a male hero and his cow.

==== Quest for the remedy ====
A motif that appears in tale type 314 is the hero having to find a cure for the ailing king, often the milk of a certain animal (e.g., a lioness). According to scholar Erika Taube, this motif occurs in tales from North Africa to East Asia, even among Persian- and Arabic-speaking peoples. Similarly, Hasan M. El-Shamy noted that the quest for the king's remedy appears as a subsidiary event "in the Arab-Berber culture area". In addition, Germanist Gunter Dammann, in Enzyklopädie des Märchens, noted that the motif of the quest for the remedy appeared "with relative frequency" in over half of the variants that start with the Subtype 2 opening (stepmother's persecution of hero and horse).

==== Branding the brothers-in-law ====
According to German scholars Günther Damman and Kurt Ranke, another motif that appears in tale type ATU 314 is the hero branding his brothers-in-law during their hunt. Likewise, Ranke stated that the hero's branding represented a mark of his ownership over his brothers-in-law.

Ranke located the motif in the Orient and in the Mediterranean. In the same vein, Hungarian professor Ákos Dömötör, in the notes to tale type ATU 314 in the Hungarian National Catalogue of Folktales (MNK), remarked that the motif was a "reflection of the Eastern legal custom", which also appears in the Turkic epic Alpamysh.

== Variants ==
According to Germanist Günter Dammann, tale type 314 with the opening of hero and horse fleeing home extends from Western Himalaya and South Siberia, to Iran and the Arab-speaking countries in the Eastern Mediterranean. In addition, scholar Hasan El-Shamy stated that type 314 is "widely spread throughout north Africa", among Arabs and Berbers; in Sub-saharan Africa, as well as in Arabia and South Arabia.

=== The King's Son and the Foal ===
In a Jewish-Afghani tale from Herat titled בן המלך והסייח ("The King's Son and the Foal"), archived in the Israeli Folktale Archives (IFA) with the number IFA 420, after a rich king loses his wife, he remarries. One day, his son, the prince, named Shahzada, offers to take care of a boatsman's lame-looking horse, in exchange for money. After a while, the animal is restored to good health, mates with a wild mare from the king's stables, and is returned to its owner. The wild mare gives birth to a foal, whom Shahzada loves, petting it and feeding it sweets. In time, the new queen begins to grow jealous of her stepson, and conspires with women how to kill him, who convince her to invite him to a feast and poison the prince's food. She tries it twice, and the foal, called "Deldel" ("דלדל") warns him on both occasions: first, the queen poisons his soup, which the foal warns to throw a spoonful to the nightingale's cage, so that the bird may eat it and die; the next time, she tries with a dish of meatballs, which the prince is to throw through the window to the dogs, so they may eat it and die. It happens thus, and Shahzada avoids the danger. Failing twice, her co-conspirators advise her to feign illness, and send for a doctor who will prescribe her the right remedy: the liver of a special breed of foal, which just happens to belong to the prince. The king is convinced to sacrifice his son's friend, and orders the mullah to hold the prince at his studies until after the slaughter. Shahzada pays a visit to the foal in the stables and finds it crying; the foal reveals they plan to kill it to further hurt the prince, but it will neigh three times when he is at the studies to alert him, then he is to ask for a last ride on the horse and whip him three times, each time harder than the last. The next day, Shahzada goes to his lessons, when he hears the horse's whinny, then forces his way back to the stables to save his foal, acting as instructed. After whipping the foal three times, the animal rises up in the air and flies away with the prince to another country. When they land, Deldel gives a tuft of its hairs to Shahzada, to summon it in case of need, then gallops away. The prince burns a hair to test it, then the horse appears at once. The prince enters the city, buys a sheepskin from a butcher to make a cap, then finds work as the apprentice to the king's gardener, and makes bouquets for the princess. One day, he begins to feel bored, then summons his horse for a ride around the garden. Meanwhile, the princess, whom the story explains is courted by many suitors, spies around the city with binoculars, and spots the mysterious rider in the garden. Deldel tells Shahzada the princess has fallen is love with him, and the prince dismisses his equine friend. Later, the princess asks the gardener's apprentice to keep bringing her the bouquets, and one time, takes the chance to question his identity, but he avoids giving a straight answer. The princess decides he is her suitor, longs for him and becomes pale and weak. The king notices her change in mood and urges her to choose a husband, which she will do on her birthday (the story explains that many would assemble at the town square, while the princess, from an elevated position, would spot her husband of choice, then give him an "apple", that is, a golden ball encrusted with diamonds). On the appointed day, many suitors gather at the city, and the princess, poised to throw the ball, cannot find the gardener's apprentice amongst the crowd, so they adjourn the event to the following week. The princess finds the gardener's apprentice (the "Kechel") in a remote corner, tells him he is her choice, and bids him to come to the assemblage. The next time, the Kechel rides to the assemblage on a lame mount, and is given the apple. The king is furious and banishes his daughter to live with the lowly servant in the stables. The princess suffers living in humble conditions, until, months later, asks her husband to show his true self. Shahzada summons his pet foal and it appears, then asks for a large palace to appear. The foal promptly attends his request: a palace materializes. The king pays a visit to the new palace and meets his daughter, who introduces him to her husband Shahzada. Shahzada tells his story to his father-in-law, stating he wishes to reconcile with his father. The king sends messengers to summon Shahzada's father, and both families celebrate a new wedding.

=== The Youth with the Sheep's Stomach on his Head ===
In an Afghan tale collected from Hazara informant Gulam Sachi, in Kabul, and translated as Der Junge mit dem Schafsmagen auf dem Kopf ("The Youth with the Sheep's Stomach on his Head"), a king has a son and a new wife. The new queen scolds and beats the prince, and even convinces the king to despise his own son. One day, the prince goes to the stables to cry after a new beating from his stepmother, when a mare approaches the boy to comfort him. The mare begins to talk and warns the boy the queen will eventually kill him one day, and advises him to escape by convincing the king to let him ride the mare around the palace three times. The prince does as instructed, but the king refuses to let his son ride the red mare, for it is his best horse. After some insistence, the prince mounts the mare, rides around the garden three times, and wrings the mare's left ear: the mare takes the prince away on an aerial journey. The king then confronts the queen about not loving the prince and allowing him to hate the boy. Back to the prince, the mare lands near a beautiful tent of lapis-lazuli, gives the youth some of its hairs, and vanishes. Inside the tent, the prince rests, until he hears a giant's roar, who has a tree stuck on its foot. The prince summons his mare to help him remove the tree from the giant's foot. The giant's brother appear on sensing a human smell, but the giant protects the prince, saying the human has helped him. Later, the prince takes a walk in the forest, when he sights a dove asking for help, since a snake is threatening its nest. The prince kills the snake, and the dove gives three of its chicks to help the prince. He also stops a hunter from shooting a lioness, which in turn offers one of its young as a helper to the prince. Some time later, the prince summons the red mare and flies off to another land, next to a beautiful tent, which also houses his friends. The prince walks up a hill and finds a large city nearby with mosques and minarets, and sights a princess in a tower. He then decides to walk towards the town, goes into an alleyway and finds work in a butcher's shop, after donning a sheep's stomach on his head. One day, the prince is resting near the butcher's shop door, when he hears the king has summoned the men in the kingdom to gather in front of the palace for the seven princesses, who are on the terrace, to choose their husbands by throwing an apple at their suitors of choice. The prince, in his lowly and dirty disguise, waits at the back of the crowd, as the six elder princesses toss their apples to rich and noble suitors, while the youngest, whom the tale explains is unaware of the importance of the event, tosses her fruit at random. The youngest princess's apple falls next to the prince, who grabs it. The king gives his cadette a new apple, and still it reaches the poor butcher's assistant. The cadette is given a third apple, and still it falls next to the poor youth. The king invites the six princesses' husbands to the palace and are given sumptuous abodes, while the youngest is moved out to the stables with her lowly husband. The prince, still in his lowly disguise, comforts his wife. Some time later, the prince invites his sons-in-law to a bird hunt, and they are to prepare a meal with the spoils. The prince, still in the butcher's assistant disguise, wants to join in the hunt, and, at a distance, summons the red mare by burning its hairs. The mare creates a tent for him, summons every bird in the world, and gives the prince royal garments and a royal stamp. The equine advises the prince to welcome his brothers-in-law after their failed hunt, they are to be given the birds' bodies, not their heads, and leaves. It happens thus: the six brothers-in-law cannot find any game, but spot the youth near the tent with the birds and ask for some of the meat. The prince agrees to a deal: the bird meat in exchange for stamping their legs. A deal is made, and the prince retains the birds' heads for his wife to prepare a meal. The king tastes the meals prepared by his six elder daughters and every dish is tasteless, save for the youngest's, on whose dish he also finds some cow dung. The youngest princess explains that they live in the stables, so the king gives them a better house. The six princesses marry in grand ceremonies, and the youngest in a humble event. Despite their situation, the princess loves her lowly husband. One day, the prince, in his disguise, tells his wife he will leave and ask her to wait for him. The prince doffs his lowly disguise and appear at the palace in his true princely identity, asking to retrieve his six runaway slaves. The king sends for his six sons-in-law and they show the prince's seal on their legs, marking them as the prince's property. The king brings his cadette to introduce her to the newcomer prince, and she recognizes her husband. The princess and the prince marry again, and decide to keep the secret of the charade between the both of them.

=== The Brave Prince ===
In an Afghan tale from Herat, The Brave Prince, a prince is raised underground, until one day his father allows him to leave his quarters so people know he is the king's son. On a walk, he sees a man hunting a dove, a deer and asks them about it. People explains they hunt and cook the game, which the prince takes an interest in. Later, he joins a hunt with a large retinue, until he reaches another city. He dimisses the hunting party and enters alone in the city, when the princess is being walked and people are watching the procession. The prince puts on some old clothes and mingles with the crowd. He squeezes the breasts of the girls and approaches the princess, who pays him some money for him to leave. He goes to another city and is taken in by an old woman, whom he pays to be allowed to spend the night. The old woman's husband, the royal gardener, appears, and tells the newcomer the king's daughters come with some ladies-in-waiting to walk in the garden. The next morning, the princesses walk around the garden and ask for some grapes, which the gardener tries to deliver and accidentally smashes all the grapes. A fowl also appears to bother them, so they ask the gardener if he could hire an assistant. The gardener brings in the newcomer, which he refers to as his nephew, who puts on some fowl entrails on his head to appear bald, and both work in the garden. Sometimes, when the prince is sad, he fumes a hair of his fairy colt (korre-ye pari, in the original) for it to appear, and both ride around the garden - which are spied on by the princess with a pair of binoculars. Three days later, the princesses meet up with their father to ask him to arrange their marriages; thus, the king assembles the people, and the princesses choose their husbands: the eldest the minister's son, the middle one the attorney's son and the youngest the bald headed gardener. The king laments his cadette's choice. The bald headed gardener then summons his fairy colt and gathers all animals around him. Meanwhile, the king orders his sons-in-law to hunt some game as proof of their mettle. The baldhead prince goes into the steppe and summons all animals, then puts on princely clothes. The king's two other sons-in-law try to hunt, but find no game, and meet with the bald headed gardener whom they do not recognize. They ask for some deer meat, and the prince agrees to a deal: the deer in exchange for setting a mark proving he was the one who gave them. The two brothers-in-law prepare some soup for the king, but he spits it out for they are tasteless, while the bald headed gardener's is delicious. The king also finds some horse dung in the bowl, and asks his youngest daughter the meaning of it: she replies it is because she and her husband now live in the horse stables. The king then orders his ministers to move them out to a castle. After the baldhead gardener and his wife move out to their new home, he declares his three brothers-in-law are his slaves, for the marks on their hips. The other sons-in-law realize the gardener was the prince at the steppe, and show the marks on their bodies. The king say the garden is his. The prince, now back to his true identity, also surpasses his brothers-in-law in an archery contest, and impresses even more his father-in-law. At the end of the tale, the prince decide to return to his father and mother's kingdom, for he misses his parents.

== See also ==
- The Black Colt
- The Wonderful Sea-Horse
- The Horse of the Cloud and the Wind
