= Couche-Dans-La-Fange =

Betsimisaraka folktale from Madagascar about a prince and his horse

Folk tale
- Name: Couche-Dans-La-Fange
- Also known as: Mandriangödra
- Aarne–Thompson grouping: ATU 314 (Goldener)
- Region: Madagascar
- Published in: Littérature orale malgache: Le tambour de l'ogre et autres contes des Betsimisaraka du nord, Madagascar Tome 2 by Fulgence Fanony (2001)
- Related: The Stallion Houssan; Kibaraka; The Story of the Prince and His Horse; Abba Hundee

Couche-Dans-La-Fange (Malagasy: Mandriangödra) is a Malagasy tale collected from a Betsimisaraka source and published in 2001. It is classified in the international Aarne-Thompson-Uther Index as ATU 314, "Goldener". It deals with a friendship between a king's son and a magic horse that are forced to flee for their lives due to the boy's stepmother, and reach another kingdom, where the boy adopts another identity.

Although it differs from variants wherein a hero acquires golden hair, its starting sequence (persecution by the hero's stepmother) is considered by scholarship as an alternate opening to the same tale type.

== Source ==
According to Fulgence Fanony, the tale was first told by Tilahy Jean Edouard, in 1968.

== Summary ==
A Grand-Seigneur (Radriambe, in the original) has a son named Gloire (Laza, in the original), born after thirty years into his marriage. Still in his mother's womb, he asked his mother to name him Gloire, predicting that his mother will die ten years after his birth and his father will remarry five years later, then asks his mother not to say anything to Grand-Seigneur. Gloire's mother follows her unborn child's instructions and gives birth to him, naming him Gloire. The boy grows up to be a handsome child and is given a horse named Grand-Blanc (Malandibe, in the original) by his father. He also learns the arts of war and weaponry (assegai, rifle, saber), and wears gold necklaces.

Just as he predicted, Gloire's mother dies when he is ten years old, and his father remarries five years later. When he is seventeen years old, his stepmother, who envies him, decides to starve herself for her hatred of her stepson, to Grand-Seigneur's worry. She also places some dry bread under her mattress to pretend her bones are aching. The Grand-Seigneur decides to consult with the seers for a solution, but the queen bribes them with two thousand piastras to keep mum about her fake illness and prescribe the flesh of Grand-Blanc, the horse, as her remedy. The king consults the seers who recommend he sacrifices the horse on Friday, and goes to talk to his son about it.

Gloire learns of the upcoming event and goes to talk to Grand-Blanc, advising it to neigh three times, when the men come for him at the pen, then when they tumble it down and lastly when they are ready to cut the horse's throat, for Gloire will appear and both will escape. However, Gloire is sent to sleep at the house of a maternal uncle. The following morning, by sunrise, he hears Grand-Blanc's neighs and pretends to have a stomachache so he could join with his friend. Gloire rushes to stop his father from killing Grand-Blanc, and asks his father to let him ride the horse seven times around the village. The Grand-Seigneur indulges his son, who packs his mother's belongings, his clothes, his father's badges and writes a goodbye letter, then goes to ride the horse. After the seventh turn, he directs his horse to the south and gallops at high speed away from his home village.

The Grand-Seigneur reads his son's goodbye letter, where it is revealed the queen's fake illness and her conspiracy with the seers, then takes his second best horse, Grand-Brun, to go after his son, but Grand-Blanc is faster and leaves the king behind. The Grand-Seigneur mourns for his missing son, and Gloire sees his father at a distance with a telescope. While wandering through the forest, Gloire kills a serpent that threatened a kite's nest and gains a chick as helper, then helps an elephant by removing a splinter from its paw, kills a Grand-Monstre and takes shelter in a cave.

After spending a night in another cave, Gloire and his animal companions find a village in the distance, and he builds a hut in a eucalyptus forest, and goes to the village to find food. He also paints his whole body with mud and goes to the village to beg for food, with people calling him Couche-dans-la-Fange. He appears before the local king, who gives him food and sends him away.

On the road back to his hut, he passes in front of the king's garden, where the princesses water their orchard and rest under the trees. He keeps taking a bath in a nearby pond at night to remove the mud, and is seen by Benjamine, the king's cadette. The princess falls in love with him and, after some exchanged letters, she sleeps with him and becomes pregnant. After the princess cannot hide the growing belly, the king learns the child is from Couche-dans-la-Fange, marries them to each other and places them in a small hut that resembles a chicken coop.

Later, envoys bring news that the kings from the West are aiming to attack his village, so he summons his three sons-in-law, powerful warriors, to command his forces to defend the realm. They also give him a lame dun horse to Couche-dans-la-Fange, but he places the lame horse in his personal pen and takes Grand-Blanc, the kite and the elephant to the battlefield. The prince and his animal companions ward off the armies of the West, and he hurts his father-in-law in the arm, then flees the battlefield to resume his lowly disguise. Some time later, envoys of the king of the East bring news of a future incursion, and again the local king sends his sons-in-law to the battlefield, while giving the same lame mount to Couche-dans-la-Fange. Gloire puts on an animal hide, rides Grand-Blanc to the battlefield, defeats the soldiers of the kings of the East, and steals his father-in-law's kerchief, who was drying tears he shed for his own dead soldiers. The king notices someone stole his handkerchief, the mysterious knight at the battlefield, and his daughters scramble to find it, to no avail.

Lastly, heralds of the southern kingdom come to warn the king of an upcoming war, and Gloire, dismissing the muddy disguise, rides to the battlefield with Grand-Blanc and his animal companions, the elephant streaming water at the soldiers to blind them and the kite removing the enemies' heads. He also takes the chance to steal his father-in-law's hat and escapes. The tale then explains that the northern kingdom, which belongs to Gloire's father, never attacked. The local king celebrates his victory and gives a better brick house to his cadette and her lowly husband, who are now with child.

In time, the king grows blind, and only milk from a female elephant can cure his sight. He sends for his three sons-in-law and Couche-dans-la-Fange, and orders them to find him the milk. On the road, Couche-dans-la-Fange points to his own hut near the eucalyptus forest and says its owner may have some, but directs his brothers-in-law to a long southern path to buy time for him to prepare his ruse. After his brothers-in-law make their way through the long path, they enter Gloire's house, who they don't recognize, and ask if he has some elephant milk for their king. Gloire, donning a hat and sitting on a chair, agrees to let them have some, in exchange for branding their bodies with a mark. A deal is made: Gloire brands his brothers-in-law with a letter F on their buttocks, and gives them some milk diluted in water. The three men return with the diluted remedy and the king is partially cured. However, Couche-dans-la-Fange appears with the correct milk and heals the king fully. The king decides to marry him to Benjamine the following Friday, during the "jour des rois".

Couche-dans-la-Fange returns to his wife, princess Benjamine, and say the following morning they will go to her father's court to receive the royal dignity. He also doffs his lowly disguise and explains to his wife he is a prince, named Gloire and with his prename Petit-Jean, son of the Grand-Seigneur in the north, who has patent honours in the XVIth degree, while the princess's father's is only of the VIIIth degree. The princess is surprised at this fact, then joins her husband and son atop Grand-Blanc as they ride to her father's court with the kite and the elephant in tow.

They arrive late at the ceremony, at eight o'clock, and the king realizes he is Couche-dans-la-fange, wearing military regalia. Gloire recognizes his father-in-law as his king and father, and he is married to Benjamine in a grand ceremony. After the wedding, Gloire returns the king the latter's hat and kerchief he stole in the battlefield, and admits he was the one to provide him with the healing milk, pointing to his brothers-in-law and asking them to lower their "pagnes" to show the F brands on their bodies, thus proving Gloire's claims. The king then nominates Gloire as the new king, and a grand celebration is made with oxen sacrifice.

== Analysis ==
=== Tale type ===
The collector described the tale as belonging "partially" to type ATU 303, "The Twins or Blood Brothers". It is classified in the international Aarne-Thompson-Uther Index as type ATU 314, "The Goldener": a youth with golden hair works as the king's gardener. The type may also open with the prince for some reason being the servant of an evil being, where he gains the same gifts, and the tale proceeds as in this variant.

==== Introductory episodes ====
Scholarship notes three different opening episodes to the tale type: (1) the hero becomes a magician's servant and is forbidden to open a certain door, but he does and dips his hair in a pool of gold; (2) the hero is persecuted by his stepmother, but his loyal horse warns him and later they both flee; (3) the hero is given to the magician as payment for the magician's help with his parents' infertility problem. Folklorist Christine Goldberg, in Enzyklopädie des Märchens, related the second opening to former tale type AaTh 532, "The Helpful Horse (I Don't Know)", wherein the hero is persecuted by his stepmother and flees from home with his horse. (Note: According to Stith Thompson's 1961 revision of the index, in type 532 the hero's helpful horse advises him to answer every question with the sentence "I don't know".)

American folklorist Barre Toelken recognized the spread of the tale type across Northern, Eastern and Southern Europe, but identified three subtypes: one that appears in Europe (Subtype 1), wherein the protagonist becomes the servant to a magical person, finds the talking horse and discovers his benefactor's true evil nature, and acquires a golden colour on some part of his body; a second narrative (Subtype 3), found in Greece, Turkey, Caucasus, Uzbekistan and Northern India, where the protagonist is born through the use of a magical fruit; and a third one (Subtype 2). According to Toelken, this Subtype 2 is "the oldest", being found "in Southern Siberia, Iran, the Arabian countries, Mediterranean, Hungary and Poland". In this subtype, the hero (who may be a prince) and the foal are born at the same time and become friends, but their lives are at stake when the hero's mother asks for the horse's vital organ (or tries to kill the boy to hide her affair), which motivates their flight from their homeland to another kingdom.

According to Germanist Gunter Dammann, tale type 314 with the opening of hero and horse fleeing home extends from Western Himalaya and South Siberia, to Iran and the Arab-speaking countries in the Eastern Mediterranean. In addition, scholar Hasan El-Shamy stated that type 314 is "widely spread throughout north Africa", among Arabs and Berbers; in sub-Saharan Africa, as well as in Arabia and South Arabia.

=== Motifs ===
Professor Anna Birgitta Rooth stated that the motif of the stepmother's persecution of the hero appears in tale type 314 in variants from Slavonic, Eastern European and Near Eastern regions. She also connected this motif to part of the Cinderella cycle, in a variation involving a male hero and his cow.

==== Quest for the remedy ====
A motif that appears in tale type 314 is the hero having to find a cure for the ailing king, often the milk of a certain animal (e.g., a lioness). According to scholar Erika Taube, this motif occurs in tales from North Africa to East Asia, even among Persian- and Arabic-speaking peoples. Similarly, Hasan M. El-Shamy noted that the quest for the king's remedy appears as a subsidiary event "in the Arab-Berber culture area". In addition, Germanist Gunter Dammann, in Enzyklopädie des Märchens, noted that the motif of the quest for the remedy appeared "with relative frequency" in over half of the variants that start with the Subtype 2 opening (stepmother's persecution of hero and horse).

==== Branding the brothers-in-law ====
According to German scholars Günther Damman and Kurt Ranke, another motif that appears in tale type ATU 314 is the hero branding his brothers-in-law during their hunt. Likewise, Ranke stated that the hero's branding represented a mark of his ownership over his brothers-in-law.

Ranke located the motif in the Orient and in the Mediterranean. In the same vein, Hungarian professor Ákos Dömötör, in the notes to tale type ATU 314 in the Hungarian National Catalogue of Folktales (MNK), remarked that the motif was a "reflection of the Eastern legal custom", which also appears in the Turkic epic Alpamysh.

In regards to a similar episode in Malagasy tale Tandrokomana, J.C. Hébert argues for an Indian provenance for the sequence.

== See also ==
- Kibaraka
- The Black Colt
- The Magician's Horse
- The Story of the Prince and His Horse
- The Stallion Houssan
