= Kibaraka =

Swahili folktale from East Africa

Folk tale
- Name: Kibaraka
- Also known as: The Giant Horse
- Aarne–Thompson grouping: ATU 314, "Goldener"
- Region: Swahili people
- Related: The Magician's Horse; The Story of the Prince and His Horse; The Stallion Houssan; Couche-Dans-La-Fange; Abba Hundee

Kibaraka is a folktale sourced from the Swahili, published in late 19th century. Linguist Jan Knappert published a very similar tale with the title The Giant Horse, wherein the protagonist is also named Kibaraka. In both, a youth named Kibaraka gets entangled with a cannibal sorcerer and escapes thanks to a giant horse's help; also with the giant horse's help, he reaches another city, where he marries a princess and performs heroic feats.

The story is classified in the international Aarne-Thompson-Uther Index as ATU 314, "Goldener" (previously, "The Youth Transformed to a Horse"), in a cycle that begins with the protagonist working for the antagonist and escaping from him on a talking horse.

== Summary ==
=== Alice Werner's summary ===
Author Alice Werner provided a summary of the story, which she considered to be "a composite tale", and some of its parts diffused along with Arab influence. In this tale, a sultan's son and a vizier's son are born on the same day, become friends, but the sultan's son abandons his friend in the wilderness during a walk. The vizier's son is found by a zimwi, who welcomes the boy into his lair and instructs him not to open a certain door, and goes to invite his friends for a cannibal feast. The vizier's son open the forbidden door and finds a giant horse inside, which warns him the zimwi is a cannibal, and urges the boy to release every animal in the house (an ox, a lion, a leopard and a donkey), steal seven magic bottles and escape with it away from the zimwi's lair. The horse swallows the animals to take along with him, and escapes with the boy in a "Magic Flight" sequence: the seven bottles are thrown behind them to create obstacles to their pursuers (thorns, rock, swords, water, fire, sea).

The giant horse and the boy reach a remote destination, and the animal creates a large house for them. The boy assumes the identity of "Kibaraka" ('Little Blessing') and dresses up as a beggar. He goes to a nearby city just in time to take part in a suitor selection test: the local sultan's seven daughters are to throw limes to their husbands of choice, the elder six cast theirs to noble men and the seventh to Kibaraka. Later, the sultan falls ill, and only leopard's milk can cure him. Kibaraka's brothers-in-law fail to procure the milk, when they sight Kibaraka, whom they do not recognize, and agree to a deal: the milk for branding their backs. Next, Kibaraka, riding the giant horse into battle, battles the sultan's, his father-in-law, enemies. He then reveals himself as Hamed, son of the Wazir of the land of Basra. Based on Kibaraka's words, being in Arabic, Werner supposed the story was brought from the Arabs to the Swahili coast.

=== Jan Knappert's version ===
In Knappert's version, translated as The Giant Horse, the youth, also named Kibaraka, is walking somewhere when a spirit takes him to his castle and gives him a set of keys, forbidding the youth to open the doors in the cellar, otherwise, he will devour the human. With this, the spirit departs, leaving Kibaraka alone in the spirit's lair. Kibaraka opens the doors in the castle: he finds a talking self-moving sword in the first one; a talking, self-moving dagger in the second one; a talking lioness to which he gives some meat, and finally a talking leopard to which he also gives meat. His curiosity is piqued, and he goes down to the castle cellar to see what is hiding down there: a giant horse, which talks to Kibaraka and says they can still escape if the youth feeds it. After eating some fodder, the horse advises Kibaraka to take with him seven bottles: sea bottle, mud bottle, fire bottle, thorn bottle, pebble bottle, needle bottle and creeper bottle. The horse tells Kibaraka to release people and the many species of cattle (goats, oxen, sheep, donkey), which the giant horse swallows.

Soon, Kibaraka is riding the giant horse away from the spirit's castle, taking with him the seven bottles. On the road, Kibaraka notices a dustcloud is moving behind them, which the horse explains it is the spirit and his friends. The animal then tells Kibaraka to throw behind him the bottles they pilfered from the castle, each bottle creating a magic obstacle to hinder their pursuers: the creeper bottle releases a forest of creeper and lianas; the thorn bottle creates a forest of thorns, the needle bottle manifests many large needles; the mud bottle creates swamps and bogs; the pebble bottle creates a huge mountain to block the pursuers' path, and the fire bottle creates a bush fire. Each large obstacle manages to deter and kill the chasing spirits, leaving only one. Finally, the youth releases the sea bottle, which creates a vast ocean between Kibaraka and the horse and the last spirit, which cannot cross the body of water.

At a safe distance, the horse stops near a mansion, where they settle: the horse opens its mouth to release the cattle they stole from the castle, and Kibaraka sells some animals to earn money. Some time later, in a nearby kingdom, the sultan arranges for his seven daughters' marriage: by throwing lemons to their suitors of choice, they are to make their selection of husbands. The six elder princesses throws their to youths of high status (the first to the son of the chief vizier and the second one to the chief cadi, for instance), but the youngest princess's lemon is caught by Kibaraka. The sultan learns Kibaraka is a lowly donkey-seller, so the princess repeats her lemon-throwing twice again, and again Kibaraka catches it. Resigning to his daughter's fate by Allah's will, the sultan marries her to Kibaraka and moves her out to the youth's house. Despite his brothers-in-law mocking the union and her sister pitying her, the princess discovers Kibaraka's house is actually furnished with cattle and servants (people who he and the Giant Horse rescued from the spirit).

Some time later, the king falls ill, and only the milk of a lioness can cure him. His six sons-in-law are too afraid to ride into the wilderness in search of a lioness, when Kibaraka appears in court with a bottle of lioness's milk, which the lioness he rescued gave him. Later, the king falls ill again, and only milk from a leopard can cure him. Again, the six sons-in-law are too afraid to hunt for a leopard, when Kibaraka enters with a bottle of leopard's milk, which the leopard he rescue from the spirit gave him. Next, war breaks out, and heathen armies come out of the wilderness to surround the realm. The sultan's six sons-in-law ride into battle, but fearing for their lives, they flee, so it is up to Kibaraka, riding a leopard and brandishing the magic sword and dagger, to defeat the enemy army and save the day. War continues for a while longer, and Kibaraka rides a lion on the second day, still wielding the sword and dagger, which vanquish the enemies. The six sons-in-law brag to the king they were the ones who defeated the enemy army, but a servant reveals to the sultan that a mysterious knight was the one responsible. The sultan, then, decides to see it for himself, and goes to the battlefield the next morning: Kibaraka, whom the sultan does not recognize, rides into battle with the giant horse and holding the sword and dagger, defeating the enemies for good. The sultan's soldiers intercept the knight and bring him to the sultan, who recognizes the knight as Kibaraka, the same one that provided the remedies for him. For this, the sultan makes Kibaraka his successor.

== Analysis ==
=== Tale type ===
The tale is classified in the international Aarne-Thompson-Uther Index as type ATU 314, "The Goldener": a youth with golden hair works as the king's gardener. The type may also open with the prince for some reason being the servant of an evil being, where he gains the same gifts, and the tale proceeds as in this variant.

==== Introductory episodes ====
Scholarship notes three different opening episodes to the tale type: (1) the hero becomes a magician's servant and is forbidden to open a certain door, but he does and dips his hair in a pool of gold; (2) the hero is persecuted by his stepmother, but his loyal horse warns him and later they both flee; (3) the hero is given to the magician as payment for the magician's help with his parents' infertility problem. Folklorist Christine Goldberg, in Enzyklopädie des Märchens, related the second opening to former tale type AaTh 532, "The Helpful Horse (I Don't Know)", wherein the hero is persecuted by his stepmother and flees from home with his horse. (Note: According to Stith Thompson's 1961 revision of the index, in type 532 the hero's helpful horse advises him to answer every question with the sentence "I don't know".)

American folklorist Barre Toelken recognized the spread of the tale type across Northern, Eastern and Southern Europe, but identified three subtypes: one that appears in Europe (Subtype 1), wherein the protagonist becomes the servant to a magical person, finds the talking horse and discovers his benefactor's true evil nature, and acquires a golden colour on some part of his body; a second narrative (Subtype 3), found in Greece, Turkey, Caucasus, Uzbekistan and Northern India, where the protagonist is born through the use of a magical fruit; and a third one (Subtype 2). According to Toelken, this Subtype 2 is "the oldest", being found "in Southern Siberia, Iran, the Arabian countries, Mediterranean, Hungary and Poland". In this subtype, the hero (who may be a prince) and the foal are born at the same time and become friends, but their lives are at stake when the hero's mother asks for the horse's vital organ (or tries to kill the boy to hide her affair), which motivates their flight from their homeland to another kingdom.

=== Motifs ===
==== The Obstacle Flight ====
According to Stith Thompson, tale type ATU 314 contains the motif of the "Obstacle Flight" (a form of the "Magic Flight"): the hero escapes from an antagonist (e.g., an ogre), and throws behind him objects to deter his pursuers, each object transforming into a magical obstacle to hinder the pursuit, like a fire or a lake.

==== The suitor selection test ====
The motif of the princess throwing an apple (lemon) to her suitor is indexed as motif H316, "Suitor test: apple thrown indicates princess' choice (often golden apple)". According to mythologist Yuri Berezkin and other Russian researchers, the motif is "popular" in Iran, and is also attested "in Central Europe, the Balkans, the Caucasus, the Near East, and Central Asia". In addition, in regards to the tale Kibaraka, Alice Werner indicated the presence of the "lime-throwing incident" in Somali and in Fulfulde.

According to Turkologist Karl Reichl, types ATU 314 and ATU 502 contain this motif: the princess chooses her own husband (of lowly appearance) in a gathering of potential suitors, by giving him an object (e.g., an apple). However, he also remarks that the motif is "spread in folk literature" and may appear in other tale types.

Germanist Günter Dammann, in Enzyklopädie des Märchens, argued that Subtype 2 (see above) represented the oldest form of the Goldener narrative, since the golden apple motif in the suitor selection roughly appears in the geographic distribution of the same subtype.

==== Quest for the remedy ====
A motif that appears in tale type 314 is the hero having to find a cure for the ailing king, often the milk of a certain animal (e.g., a lioness). According to scholar Erika Taube, this motif occurs in tales from North Africa to East Asia, even among Persian- and Arabic-speaking peoples. Similarly, Hasan M. El-Shamy noted that the quest for the king's remedy appears as a subsidiary event "in the Arab-Berber culture area".

== Variants ==
According to folklorist Stith Thompson, tale type ATU 314 is known in all parts of Africa. Likewise, Hasan El-Shamy noted that the tale type existed in Subsaharan Africa.

=== East Africa ===
In a tale from the Swahili titled The Wonderful Warrior, Abdallah, the Vizir's son, becomes the sultan's son's playmate, until the latter gets bored with him. Abdallah is expelled from the palace and wanders the desert. A Magician finds him and takes him in as his apprentice. One day, the Magician explains he will go on a journey, gives him the keys to his house, and warns him not to open a certain door. While the Magician is away, Abdallah opens every door, and sees a leopard, a lion and a talking sword. He opens the last door and finds a horse. The horse tells him that the Magician lured and devoured its previous owner, and that the same fate may befall Abdallah if they do not escape. The horse tells him to make preparations: take a saddle, the sword and seven bottles from a chest, and release the lion and the leopard. Abdallah escapes on the horse and sees a cloud of smoke coming after them: it is the Magician and some friends. The horse tells its rider to throw behind them one of the bottles to create obstacles: two forests of thorns, a mudslide, a mountain of stones, a wall of fire, and lastly a large sea-wave. Abdallah and the horse reach a kingdom, and the horse advises him to dress in poor and ragged clothes. Abdallah goes to the city to a crowd that gathered to see the princesses' husband selection by lemon-throwing. The seventh princess throws her lemon and it lands near Abdallah. Her father, the sultan, marries the princess to the newcomer beggar and places them in a poor hut. Some time later, war breaks out three times, and three times Abdallah rides into battle to defend his father-in-law's kingdom, but he is given a lame donkey as mount. He ties the donkey to a tree and consults with the horse, which advises him to ride his animal companions into battle: the leopard on the first battle, the lion on the second and the horse on the third day. The enemy retreats, but hurts Abdallah in his hand before retreating. The king rides alongside Abdallah, who is still in his mysterious knight guise. As a mark of honour, the king ties his own turban on the stranger, when he excuses himself and returns to his lowly beggar appearance. The king insists to know Abdallah's whereabouts and the reason for his absence at the battlefield, so he goes to talk to him at his hut. He enters Abdallah's room and finds a wrapping around his injured hand and the border of his own royal turban under Abdallah's cloak. Abdallah then reveals the whole truth, and the king promises to fulfill any request, so Abdallah asks for his brothers-in-law to be made into his slaves, since they mocked him. The king grants his request, and makes Abdallah his successor.

In a Swahili tale published by Chauncey Hugh Stigand with the title Ali of the Crooked Arm, a Sultan has seven wives and seven children, just as his Wazir has seven wives and seven sons. The Sultan's seventh son is friends with the Wazir's seventh child, a boy named Ali who was born with a crooked arm. Both boys ask their fathers to buy them each a white horse, and they engage in a friendly horseback riding competition. For the first day, they ride away, but return safely at six o'clock. The next day, they agree to race to a garden and pluck pomegranates from a tree. Both ride to the tree and each pluck a fruit, but Ali fetches one that holds the Jin of Jehan inside, who abducts people yearly. Ali and his friend ride again, a fierce competition between them, but the Sultan's son sees that Ali's horse is flying the air to another region. When Ali and his horse land, he notices he is lost, when the Jin of Jehan appears to the boy and tells him to fasten the horse. The next day, the Jin tells Ali to fire a cooking-pot, and in the following day, gives the boy a set of keys, telling him to open only one room, and not the other six. While the Jin is away, Ali lifts the cauldron lid and finds human parts cooking inside. The boy resigns to his fate as another victim, and hurts his finger while playing with a knife. After the Jin returns, he finds the boy's injury and heals it. The next day, the Jin says he will be absent during a fortnight, and leaves Ali alone. The boy decides to open every door: behind the first one, he finds a giant horse that warns the boy the Jin lied to him, for he will be back in eight days. Ali then opens the remaining doors: he finds seven maidens reading the Koran (who are to be the Jin's victims), another full of horse's fodder, another with magic swords, the second-to-last holding seven magical bottles ("the first was full of sun, the second of rain, the third of needles, the fourth of hail, the fifth of thorns, the sixth of mud, and the seventh of sea"), and the last hiding the horse's jewelled saddle. The horse bids the boy feeds it wheat before the Jin returns so it regains its strength for their escape. Ali ties seven bags on the giant horse, each maiden inside each bag, and other bags filled with wheat for the horse and the precious gems. Ali takes the seven bottles and he rides the horse through the air, the Jin and his seven compatriots seeing the humans' flight. The Jin and the other demons chase after the horse, which bids Ali throws down the magic bottles, one at a time: the sun burns the demons, the rain pours down on them, the needles to hurt their feet; the hail pours on them, the thorns to hurt their feet, the mud to make the road slippery, and finally the bottle of the sea creates a sea between them, drowning many demons. At a safe distance, the pair stop to rest and the horse advises Ali to trust in him, not to talk to anyone for seven days when he arrives home, and ask the horse before anything. Ali rides into his home kingdom, his father, the Wazir, rejoices at his return. Ali builds a house with seven storeys, and places there the seven maidens he rescued from the Jin. Researcher E. Ojo Arewa devised a classification system for tales from the northern East Africa cattle area. He classified Stigand's story as type 4110 in his system, comparable to international tale type 314.

=== Zanzibar ===
In a Zanzibari tale titled Pepo Aliyedanganywa na Mtoto wa Sultani, translated by Edward Steere with as The Spirit who was Cheated by the Sultan's Son (also published as The Spirit and the Sultan's Son) and to German by Olga Töppen as Der Geist, der von des Sultans Sohn betrogen wurde, a sultan suffers for not having children, so a demon disguises himself as a magician and promises to fulfill his wish, for a price. The sultan tries to offer his properties, but the demon asks for one of the future children in exchange. The sultan agrees, the demon later returns with a medicine to be given to the queen, who gives birth to three children in separate pregnancies. The demon returns and asks for his price. The sultan agrees to let the demon have them for a time, so that the boys can learn and be taught. It happens thus and the demon returns with the boys, now learned pupils, and delivers two of them to the king and retains one of them. The demon takes the boy with him and gives him a set of keys. While the demon is away, the boy opens up a door where a molten gold liquid is flowing. The boy accidentally dips his finger in it and it becomes gold, which he hides under a rag. When the demon returns after a month, he notices the boy's finger, which he lies was an injury. The demon then leaves again, and the boy takes the opportunity to open every door: he finds animals bones and humans skulls behind the door, and finally a living horse in the seventh and last door. The horse begins to talk and warns the boy both he and the animal will be the demon's victims, but they can escape: first, open up the treasure room so that the horse can swallow everything up; next, when the demon returns, he will prepare the cooking pot, asking the boy to fetch firewood and kindle the fire, but the boy is to feign ignorance and ask him to teach how to do it; the last sequence is when the demon ties up a swing for the boy to climb into, but he is once again to show the demon how to play on the swing; the boy is then to shove the demon inside the cauldron of hot ghee. The next time the demon appears, he makes arranges to cook the boy, by fetching firewood and kindling the fire, unaware of the boy's hidden plans. He then sets up a swing, on which he climbs on, but the boy shoves the demon inside the cauldron, ending the threat. After the demon dies, the boy goes to meet the horse, and both ride away from the demon's lair. While they are at a distance, the demons' companions come to feast on their supposed victim, and eat the contents of the cauldron, waiting for their compatriot to appear. Back to the boy and the horse, they ride through towns until they reach the edge of one, where they establish themselves: they build a large house, with the cattle and the slaves the horse rescued from the demon's lair and swallowed up. The local people comment on the large house on the outskirts of the town, and news reach the local sultan's ears, who decide to check it for himself, so he sends emissaries first to ask about the house's owner. The boy answers he is a foreigner, and the sultan goes to meet the stranger in person. Both strike a friendship, and walk in the sultan's palace. The sultan then marries his daughter to the stranger, and they both have a son. The boy lives with his wife and son and his friend, the horse. The tale was provided to Steere by an informant named Hamisi wa Kayi, or Khamis bin Abubekr. Linguist Henry Tourneux translated the tale to French with the title Le diable et le fils du sultan ("The Devil and the Sultan's Son") and described the tale as "close" to international tale type ATU 314. Researcher E. Ojo Arewa devised a classification system for tales from the northern East Africa cattle area. He classified Steere's story as type 4135 in his system, containing the episode of the hero and horse's flight from international tale type 314.

In a tale from Zanzibar translated by George Bateman as The Magician and the Sultan's Son, a sultan with three sons laments the fact that no one seems to be able to teach them anything. A magician named Mchaa′wee appears and asks to take one of the sultan's sons as a companion, and chooses the youngest, called Keejaa′naa. One day, the magician gives Keejaa′naa the keys to his house, and says he will away for a while. Keejaanaa opens a door with a golden pool and dips his finger into it. The next time, the boy opens the remaining doors: he sees piles of animal bones in the first room and humans skulls in the sixth chamber, and finds a horse named Faaraa'see in the seventh one. The boy tells the horse they are in his father's house, but the horse warns him the magician eats animals and people, and they are next. The horse then asks Keejaanaa to unfasten him, and advises him: when the magician returns, he will prepare the cooking pot by fetching firewood and kindling the fire, but the boy is to feign ignorance and ask the magician to teach him; the magician will want to teach him a swing game (which is a trap), and the boy is to ask him to show him how to play, and shove the magician into the pot; then meet the horse after the deed is done. As the horse predicted, the magician returns and is preparing the cooking pot, and lies to Keejaa'naa they will play a swing game. Keejaanaa asks the magician to show him how to play, and the boy shoves the magician into the pot. Keejaanaa goes to meet with Faaraa'see and both ride away from the magician's compound. The magician's guests arrive and wait for their host, but end up the contents of the cooking pot. Back to Keejaanaa and the horse, they reach the outskirts of another town, and establish themselves there: they build a house and buy slaves and cattle with the gold the horse swallowed up before they escaped from the magician's home. The local residents marvel at Keejaanaa's house, and their sultan pays him a visit ton inquire about the stranger. Keejaanaa and the sultan become friends, and he marries the sultan's daughter and fathers a son. The boy still loves the horse Faaraasee, and the tale ends.

== See also ==
- The Black Colt
- The Magician's Horse
- The Story of the Prince and His Horse
- The Stallion Houssan
- Couche-Dans-La-Fange
