= The Story of the Prince and His Horse =

Modern Egyptian folktale

Folk tale
- Name: The Story of the Prince and His Horse
- Also known as: Histoire du prince et son cheval
- Aarne–Thompson grouping: ATU 314 (Goldener)
- Region: Egypt
- Published in: Contes arabes modernes by Guillaume Spitta-Bey (1883)
- Related: The Stallion Houssan; Donotknow; The Black Colt; The Wonderful Sea-Horse; The Tale of Clever Hasan and the Talking Horse

Histoire du prince et de son cheval (English: "Story of the prince and his horse") is a modern Egyptian folktale first collected by author Guillaume Spitta-Bey in the late-19th century. Orientalist E. A. Wallis Budge translated it as The Story of the Prince and his Horse. Orientalist J. C. Mardrus included the tale as The Eleventh Captain's Tale in his translation of The Arabian Nights, despite it not being part of the original text of the compilation.

The tale is classified in the international Aarne-Thompson-Uther Index as type ATU 314, "Goldener", with an alternate introductory episode: evil stepmother persecutes hero and his horse. Similar tales are known across North Africa and the Middle East.

== Source ==
According to Guillaume Spitta-Bey, the tale was provided by one cheik Mohammed ˤAsalyje.

== Summary ==
A sultan's son and a mare's foal are born at the same time, and their respective mothers die. The foal is given to the prince, who pets and feeds it whenever he comes back from school. To abate his sorrow, the sultan remarries. The sultan's new wife (originally a slave girl), however, has a lover, a Jew, and both conspire to kill her step-son. One day, the horse cries and confesses to the prince, named Mohammed L'Avisé (Arabic: ˀśśâțir Meḥammed; English: "Clever Mohammed", or "Muhammad the Clever One", in Wallis Budge's translation), about his stepmother's devious plan to kill him by adding poison to his food. Warned by the horse, however, the prince gives the poisoned food to a cat, which eats it and dies.

Failing that, the Jew tells the sultan's wife to feign illness and demand the foal's heart as a cure for her. She follows his instructions and tricks her husband into killing his son's pet horse. Clever Mohammed convinces his father to let him take a last ride on the animal before its execution. The next morning, the prince mounts the horse and gallops away from his family, away from his kingdom and into another realm. Clever Mohammed buys a poor man's shabby garments. His horse then gives him a hair of its mane and a firestone to summon him.

Clever Mohammed enters the kingdom and talks to the local king's royal gardener, who hires him as his assistant. Clever Mohammed works driving the oxen in the garden to turn the water wheel to irrigate the royal gardens. One day, Clever Mohammed summons his horse, wears his princely garments and rides around the garden, trampling the ground - an event witnessed by the king's youngest princess. The boy then dismisses his horse and goes back to his shabby disguise. The royal gardener appears soon after and, seeing the destruction around the garden, threatens to punish him, but the youngest princess orders him to rest his hand and not harm the boy.

Some time later, the king's seven daughters throw their kerchiefs to choose their husbands as a retinue passes under the window of the princesses' castle. The six elder princesses throw theirs to noble men, but the youngest withholds hers since she cannot see the gardener's assistant in the crowd. The king then orders the boy to the brought to the assemblage. As soon as she sees him, she throws her kerchief to him, signifying her choice, much to her father's disgust. The king marries his six elder daughters, but orders his youngest to be locked up in a room with her low-born husband.

The king's disappointment makes him ill, and only the milk of a she-bear brought in the skin of a she-bear can cure him. (Note: According to Spitta-Bey, the word in the original, labwa, meant originally 'lioness', but, since at the time lions were "unknown" in Egypt, he took it to mean a she-bear.) He orders his six sons-in-law to search for the she-bear's milk. The king sends his sons-in-law to get the cure for him and gives Clever Mohammed a lame horse to join in the quest. While his brothers-in-law depart ahead of him, Clever Mohammed summons his loyal horse and asks for a tent and a pen filled with bears. His brothers-in-law arrive and ask Clever Mohammed - which they do not recognize - for some of the bears' milk. Clever Mohammed agrees to give some to them, in exchange for him branding their backs with his ring and a circle. The brothers-in-law agree to it and are give old bear's milk to give to the king, while Clever Mohammed keeps the real cure to himself. The six sons-in-law's remedy is useless, while Clever Mohammed gives his father-in-law the correct one, much to the latter's annoyance.

Later, war breaks out, and the king has to fight for the kingdom. Clever Mohammed is given another lame mule to join with his father-in-law's troops, but dismisses his mount and summons his magic horse to ride into battle. Clever Mohammed vanquishes the king's enemies for the first day, to the king's surprise, then goes back home to rest. The second day, he rides his own horse again and defeats another part of the enemy army, and is given a ring by the king. On the third day, Claver Mohammed finally defeats the entire enemy army, but is injured in the arm. The king bandages Mohammed's injury with his handkerchief, and he departs.

After the war, the king complains that his six sons-in-law did nothing to defend the kingdom, and his youngest daughter suggests he finds his ring and his handkerchief. The king then pays a visit to Clever Mohammed and sees the ring and the handkerchief on him, and realizes the truth. Clever Mohammed wakes up and explains to his father-in-law that he is a prince, exiled from home, and says he was after his own father's six slaves, branded on their backs with his father's sigil. The king warms up to him and celebrates a proper wedding for his youngest daughter. At the end of the tale, Clever Mohammed returns to his homeland and, succeeding his now deceased father, orders the execution of his stepmother and her Jew lover.

== Analysis ==
=== Tale type ===
The tale is classified in the Aarne-Thompson-Uther Index as type ATU 314, "The Goldener": a youth with golden hair works as the king's gardener. The type may also open with the prince for some reason being the servant of an evil being, where he gains the same gifts, and the tale proceeds as in this variant.

American folklorist D. L. Ashliman classified The Eleventh Captain's Tale in the Aarne-Thompson Index as type AaTh 314, "The Golden-Haired Boy and His Magic Horse".

==== Introductory episodes ====
Scholarship notes three different opening episodes to the tale type: (1) the hero becomes a magician's servant and is forbidden to open a certain door, but he does and dips his hair in a pool of gold; (2) the hero is persecuted by his stepmother, but his loyal horse warns him and later they both flee; (3) the hero is given to the magician as payment for the magician's help with his parents' infertility problem. Folklorist Christine Goldberg, in Enzyklopädie des Märchens, related the second opening to former tale type AaTh 532, "The Helpful Horse (I Don't Know)", wherein the hero is persecuted by his stepmother and flees from home with his horse. (Note: According to Stith Thompson's 1961 revision of the index, in type 532 the hero's helpful horse advises him to answer every question with the sentence "I don't know".)

American folklorist Barre Toelken recognized the spread of the tale type across Northern, Eastern and Southern Europe, but identified three subtypes: one that appears in Europe (Subtype 1), wherein the protagonist becomes the servant to a magical person, finds the talking horse and discovers his benefactor's true evil nature, and acquires a golden colour on some part of his body; a second narrative (Subtype 3), found in Greece, Turkey, Caucasus, Uzbekistan and Northern India, where the protagonist is born through the use of a magical fruit; and a third one (Subtype 2). According to Toelken, this Subtype 2 is "the oldest", being found "in Southern Siberia, Iran, the Arabian countries, Mediterranean, Hungary and Poland". In this subtype, the hero (who may be a prince) and the foal are born at the same time and become friends, but their lives are at stake when the hero's mother asks for the horse's vital organ (or tries to kill the boy to hide her affair), which motivates their flight from their homeland to another kingdom.

=== Motifs ===
Professor Anna Birgitta Rooth stated that the motif of the stepmother's persecution of the hero appears in tale type 314 in variants from Slavonic, Eastern European and Near Eastern regions. She also connected this motif to part of the Cinderella cycle, in a variation involving a male hero and his cow.

==== Quest for the remedy ====
A motif that appears in tale type 314 is the hero having to find a cure for the ailing king, often the milk of a certain animal (e.g., a lioness). According to scholar Erika Taube, this motif occurs in tales from North Africa to East Asia, even among Persian- and Arabic-speaking peoples. Similarly, Hasan M. El-Shamy noted that the quest for the king's remedy appears as a subsidiary event "in the Arab-Berber culture area". In addition, Germanist Gunter Dammann, in Enzyklopädie des Märchens, noted that the motif of the quest for the remedy appeared "with relative frequency" in over half of the variants that start with the Subtype 2 opening (stepmother's persecution of hero and horse).

== Variants ==
According to Germanist Günter Dammann, tale type 314 with the opening of hero and horse fleeing home extends from Western Himalaya and South Siberia, to Iran and the Arab-speaking countries in the Eastern Mediterranean. In addition, scholar Hasan El-Shamy stated that type 314 is "widely spread throughout north Africa", among Arabs and Berbers; in Sub-saharan Africa, as well as in Arabia and South Arabia.

=== Egypt ===
==== The Enchanted Horse ====
In a tale collected by Yacoub Artin Pacha in the Nile Valley with the title Le Cheval Enchanté ("The Enchanted Horse"), a widowed king remarries. His new wife hates how her husband dotes on her stepson, the prince, but, when he is old as the king becomes older, she falls in love with her stepson. The prince rebuffs her, and for this she tries to poison him by poisoning his food. With the prince's horse's warning, he avoids eating the poisoned food. The queen discovers the prince and the horse's connection, feigns illness and asks for the liver of the prince's horse as cure. The king decides to sacrifice the horse. The prince goes to meet the horse and finds it in tears. The animal then advises the prince to beg for one last ride with it. It happens thus, and the king allows it. The prince seizes the opportunity to escape with the horse to another kingdom. At a safe distance, the horse gives the prince some tufts of his hair to summon him and vanishes. The prince finds work as the second king's gardener, and likes to ride around in the garden on his loyal horse. The king's third daughter, a princess, likes to peer out of her window, and sees a mysterious man on a horse in the garden. On one moonlit night, she discovers that the rider is the gardener and wants to marry him. Much to her father's disgust, he marries his third daughter to the gardener, but expels her from the palace to live in the gardener's hut. Later, war breaks out, and the gardener, joined by his faithful horse, helps his father-in-law and brothers-in-law, as a mysterious knight clad in green, red and white. Renewing their hope, the king's army advances and defeats their enemies. However, during the battle, the mysterious knight is injured in the arm. The king himself goes to dress the knight's wound and removes his mask: it is the gardener son-in-law. The gardener, or prince, reveals his whole story to his father-in-law. The king nominates his third daughter as mistress of the country and her husband as his vizier. The prince, in his new position, builds a nice stablehouse for his loyal horse.

==== The Magic Filly ====
Hasan El-Shamy collected a tale from a 16-year old Bedouin in 1969 and published it in 1980 with the title The Magic Filly. In this tale, a king remarries. His new wife hates her stepson, named Clever Muhammed, and tries to poison him twice: in his food and in his clothes dye, but twice she is thwarted by the warnings of his magic filly. Tired of the defeats, the stepmother, with the help of her secret lover, feigns illness and says the only cure is the flesh of the boy's filly. The boy learns of this through the filly, and tells his father he wants to ride the filly at least once. The king indulges his son, and the prince rides the mare twice, then flees with the animal to another kingdom. At a safe distance, the filly gives him three of its hairs, and departs. The boy finds an oil vendor and trades clothes with him. He rests by the wall of a king's palace, and the king's seven daughters see him. They tell him he can work for them by doing chores, like sweeping and tending their father's garden. In a safe corner of the garden, he summons the filly to ride and is seen by the king's seventh daughter, who falls in love with him. She keeps his secret. Some time later, the king summons all men of marriageable age for a suitor selection ceremony, where his daughters are to give their shawls to men of their choice. The youngest daughter gives her shawl to the gardener. Her father says he will put her in the dung with her husband. The next morning, armies of men take the king's money and possessions, and the six sons-in-law ride after them to get the king's possessions back. The gardener (named Clever Muhammad) rides on a lame jackass, then summons the filly to defeat the armies and regain the king's possessions. In the middle of the battle, the king, his father-in-law, accidentally hurts Clever Muhammad's arm, and bandages the wound with his handkerchief. Clever Muhammad rides back to the palace with the filly, dismisses it, and mounts the lame donkey to keep up appearances. The king summons his sons-in-law and the gardener to see who is the mysterious personage that he hurt. El-Shamy classified the tale as type 314. In his 1987 study of folktales, folklorist D. L. Ashliman classified this tale as type AaTh 314, "The Golden-Haired Boy and his Magic Horse".

==== The Green Horse ====
Researcher Celeste Míguez Seoane collected an Egyptian tale from New Valley with the title ﴬﺧﻷا نﺎﺼﺤﻟا, which she translated as El caballo verde ("The Green Horse"). In this tale, a boy and a foal are born in the same day. The foal is named Green Horse and becomes the boy's best friend as he grows up. Eventually, the boy's mother dies and his father marries a woman who hates the boy and plans to kill him. First, the boy's step-mother gives him some poisoned pigeons, but, on the horse's advice, the boy throws the food to the dog. She next places poisoned glass on the stairs and, failing that, gives him clothes doused with poison. The horse warns him of both attempts, and she notices the animal is the one helping him. Thus, she pretends to be ill and asks for the green horse's liver as cure. Her husband decides to kill the horse, but the animal advises the boy to ask his father for one last ride, as well as for a cube of gold and a cube of coins. The boy rides the green horse and throws the gold and coins to the people to distract them, and flees from home to another kingdom. He finds a mask in a trash bin, and is given three hairs of the green horse's mane. The boy finds work as a king's gardener, and is ordered to cover a deserted land with green grass. The boy summons the green horse and it fulfills the king's request. Time passes, and the boy summons the horse to ride it around the garden, but he is seen by the king's youngest daughter. Eventually, the king prepares his three daughters' marriage by having them throw kerchiefs to her suitors: the elder princess to a prince, the middle princess to a king, and the youngest to the masked gardener. The king, satisfied with the elder princesses's marriages, gives them a grand ceremony and palaces for each of them. Wanting to have the same gifts as his sisters-in-law, the boy prays to God for the king to fall ill. It so happens. The boy rides the green horse to a mountain, milks a gazelle and brings the milk to the king. He is cured, but still does not prepare his youngest's wedding. Later, the boy prays again to God, and wishes for an army to attack the kingdom. It happens again. The boy rides the green horse, defeats the army and goes back home. The king sees the boy without his mask, and his daughter reveals her husband is the one who brought him the remedy and defeated the enemy army. So the king arranges a grand wedding for his youngest daughter and the gardener.

=== Africa ===
==== North Africa ====
In a North African tale translated from English to Russian with the title "Волшебная кобылица" ("The Magic Mare"), a widowed king has a son named Muhammad. Before her death, the queen tells prince Muhammad she is dying, but gifts him a magical mare that can help him. Time passes, and the king remarries, but the new queen hates her stepson, so she decides to kill him. The mare, however, warns the prince not to touch the bread, for the queen has poisoned it. Her plan being foiled, the queen suspects the prince is getting help, and discovers about the talking mare. With the help of a secret paramour, she feigns illness and her lover, disguised as a doctor, prescribes that the king's mare shall be sacrificed for the queen to heal. Prince Muhammad learns of the mare's impending death, but the mare comforts him and bids him take three hairs from its mane. The king sacrifices the mare, to prince Muhammad's great sadness. One day, the prince trades clothes with an oil merchant and departs from his father's palace to another country, and stops to rest near a palace wall. The local king's seven beautiful daughter, the princess, spot the newcomer and ask if he could become their new servant. Muhammad agrees, and goes to work in the gardens. One day, when no one is looking, the prince rubs the hairs and summons the magic mare to him; he rides it around the garden - an event witnessed by the youngest princess, who suspects the gardener is of noble origin and falls in love with him. The youngest princess then convinces her father to arrange their future marriages, and the monarch sends for eligible men to gather in front of the palace for the princesses to choose their husbands by throwing a shawl at their suitors of choice. The six elder princesses throw theirs, and the cadette princess to their gardener. The king, furious, threatens to lock the pair up in prison. The following morning, war erupts, and enemy troops march to attack the princesses' kingdom. The king sends for his sons-in-law and gives Muhammad, the gardener, a lame donkey. Muhammad wishes to join in the fight, but the king mocks him. At a distance, Muhammad summons the mare and rides it to battle. He and the king are fighting the enemies, while the six sons-in-law have run away in fear. The king injures Muhammad in the hand and bandages it to identify the stranger, but Muhammade rides away from battle and mounts the lame donkey to keep up appearances. The monarch decides to look for the mysterious knight and sends for the six sons-in-law, whose hands are intact, then sends for the lowly gardener. Muhammad is brought before the king, who recognizes the injury and bandage on the latter's hand. He then proclaims Muhammad as his true successor and banishes the other six sons-in-law. At the end of the tale, prince Muhammad takes the princess, his wife, back to his father's realm, and learns his stepmother has died in the meantime.

==== Somali people ====
In a Somali tale published by Edwin Sidney Hartland with the title Habiyo Butiya ("Lame Habiyo"), a widowed Sultan remarries, but his new wife conspires with a Jew lover to poison her step-son's food. The Sultan's son, however, is warned of the treachery by his talking mare. After being foiled, the Sultan's wife is advised by the Jew to feign illness and ask for the mare's liver as remedy. Learning of this, the boy asks to ride the mare one last time, and gallops away to another kingdom. At a distant place, he sees six girls bathing in the lake. The boy disguises himself as a cripple, and finds work in the city. Later, the girls, daughters of the city's sultan, wish to marry, and every man is summoned to court, including the cripple, named Lame Habiyo. The girls throw oranges to choose their husbands, and the youngest girl's lands near Lame Habiyo. They marry. Later, the king and queen have gone blind, and only rhinoceros's milk can restore their sight. Lame Habiyo rides a lame donkey behind his five brothers-in-law, but takes a detour and summons the mare by burning its hairs. He and the mare ride to the rhinoceros pride, milk them and bring it back. He meets his brothers-in-law and agrees to give them milk, in exchange for him branding his name on their backs. The six return to town; the sultan's five sons-in-law give him milk that does nothing, while Lame Habiyo shows him the true milk. The king and queen's sights are restored, and Lame Habiyo becomes the next Sultan after him.

==== Bilen people ====
Austrian Africanist Leo Reinisch collected a tale from the Bilen language with the title Hámed ábin Jẳgī sīm qǔrás kegantó sanẳ (German: Der bettler Hamed heiratet die königstochter von Dschaga, English: "How beggar Hamed married the daughter of the Jaga king"). In this tale, a boy named Hamed is asked by his mother which she should give birth to: a girl or a mare. He answers: to a mare. A mare is born and their mother dies. Some time later, his father remarries. The step-mother complains to a neighbour her husband sleeps with her son, and the neighbour suggests she should get rid of the boy. The first time, she tries to poison his food, but the mare warns him. The next time, she places a snake on the milk pot. Again, the mare saves him. Frustrated with his family life, Hamed takes the mare and rides to the kingdom of the Jaga, where he disguises himself as a beggar and dismisses the mare. In this kingdom, the princess has rejected many suitors, but, on seeing Hamed as a beggar, declares she shall marry him. Hamed is given some tail hair by the mare. Later, some robbers think the Jaga king is frail and old, and his son-in-law a mere beggar, and steal their cattle. Hamed then burns the mare's tail hair and, with her aid, steals back the cattle. The next time, the king goes blind, and Hamed summons the mare again. The animal explains its milk can cure the king. Hamed milks the mare and heals the king. Finally, he is made king after his father-in-law. His sister, the mare, says its goodbyes and goes to their mother.

==== Tunisia ====
In a Tunisian tale translated into Russian as "Адхам" ("Adham"), a boy named Ali, with golden hair and silver hair, is persecuted by his step-mother, but helped by his loyal horse Adham. Things come to a head when the step-mother pretends to be ill and demands the horse to be sacrificed, but Ali rides the animal to another kingdom, where he finds work as a seller's apprentice. The king's daughters choose their husbands by throwing balls, and the youngest's falls near Ali. They marry and the king banishes his daughter to a lowly station. Later, the king goes blind, and only lioness's milk wrapped in a bag made of gazelle hide can save him. Ali rides his horse to find the cure before his brothers-in-law, and, when he meets them en route, gives them an innocuous milk in exchange for them cutting off their earlobes.

==== Niger ====
French ethnologue Geneviève Calame-Griaule collected, in Tegidda-n-Tesemt, in Niger, a tale from a Isawaghen source. In this tale, titled Khaboobi or Khaboobi, le cheval merveilleux ("Khaboobi, the wonderful horse"), a man has married and divorced many times, and still has not fathered a son. One day, he meets an old woman who advises him to find himself a slave woman that is poised to give birth to just one son, and a mare that is to foal a single colt. The man follows her instructions and finds the slave woman and the mare. The mare foals a colt named Khaboobi and the slave woman gives birth to a boy they name Mohammed-Fils-du-propriétaire-du-monde. Years later, when Mohammed is young, he is given an old mare as mount, when an old woman tells him about his destined ride, his "égal" ("equal"). Mohammed gives a present to the old woman and says his "égal" is a colt named Khaboobi. Learning of this, the boy climbs a wall and threatens to jump if his father does not show him the colt. Khaboobi is given to him, Mohammed mounts it and rides away from home until he reaches a large river. Khaboobi then tells the boy to change his clothes, find himself a house in a nearby village, and if he needs anything, their rendezvous point shall be a ziga tree, then departs. Mohammed obeys the horse's advice and seeks shelter with an old woman in the village. While living with the old woman, he asks her where he can wash himself, and she directs him to the "miroir" of a local chief. He goes to wash himself in the miroir and is spied on by the chief's daughter, who tells a slave to follow him and discover where he lives. The chief's daughter takes an interest in the mysterious boy and demands meat from a pintade (guinea fowl). The drums resound and the "Awoy" begin the hunt. Mohammed summons Khaboobi and they hunt for the guinea fowls to themselves, and the horse departs. The Awoy meet Mohammed and ask him for some fowls; Mohammed agrees to share them, in exchange for the Awoy's engagement rings. The chief's daughter chooses the fowl brought by Mohammed. A week later, she asks for lioness's milk, and the Akkaba (another male regiment) begin the hunt. Mohammed summons Khaboobi again to ask for help on getting the lioness's milk, and they fill enough jars with it. The Akkaba finds him in the woods and ask for some of the milk jars; Mohammed agrees to give them, in exchange for marking their backs with a firebrand. Mohammed gives them the lioness's milk, but keeps to himself a jar of white mare's milk which he gives to chief's daughter, to her satisfaction. Later, a foreign chief threatens to invade the kingdom; Mohammed summons Khaboobi and they ride into battle: Mohammed killing his enemies and Khaboobi swallowing them. Mohammed is injured in battle and the chief bandages his wound with his turban, and the boy flees from the battlefield. The local chief, then, summons the men in hopes of finding his lost turban, and discover Mohammed, who also lost a shoe in the process. The chief then marries his daughter to Mohammed. Later, the boy assembles a crowd and summons Khaboobi to furnish him with his garments, his cattle and his slaves. Mohammed then points to the men who were marked with a firebrand, which is confirmed by his father-in-law.

==== South Africa ====
In a tale from the Malay Quarter published by author Izak David du Plessis with the title The Winged Horse, a sultan's son and a pitch-black foal are born at the same time. When the boy, called Ishmael, is seventeen, his father gifts him the black horse, which is named Cavallo Di Wingo. The sultan also remarries, but his new wife, Hadjira, despises her step-son and plots to kill him by poisoning his food. With the horse's warnings, however, he avoids the danger. Later, the step-mother conspires with a dukun to feign illness and ask for the entrails of the pitch-black horse as cure. The horse warns the boy of Hadjira's plot and both hatch their own plan: the next day, when the horse is to be executed, the boy is to ask for one last ride on the horse. It happens so: Ishmael rides Cavallo Di Wingo three times through the ranks of soldiers; after the third lap, he then shouts Bismillah; a cloud descends upon them and transports them to the top of a mountain. The horse advises the boy to pray twice more, and a sultan's robe and a white robe appear next to him. The animal then tells the boy that in a nearby kingdom there is a sultan with his three daughters, and that he must find work there, then vanishes. He tries to find employment with the king, but the latter dismisses him. The youngest princess, Jogira, intercedes on his behalf and convinces her father to have him work in the flower-garden. Ishmael begins to work in the flower-garden and the flowers begin to bloom, and Jogira begins to fall in love with him. Some time later, the garden has flourished with beautiful colours, and many princes from neighbouring kingdoms come to see it and ask for Jogira's hand in marriage. The princess announces she will stand on the palace roof and toss an orange to her husband of choice. Jogira casts the orange three times, and on all three times Ishmael catches it. Despite his protests, the sultan gives Jogira to Ishmael. Later, the sultan falls ill; Ishmael overhears the dukun saying that only the meat of a white goat can cure him. The youth summons his loyal horse, Cavallo Di Wingo, and finds the white goat. when he is preparing the meat by taking out its entrails, two men approach him - his brothers-in-law. They ask for the meat - unaware it has no entrails - and Ishmael agrees to give it to them. Later, war breaks out; the sultan's sons-in-law ride into battle, Ishmael on an old, lame horse, under the mockery and jeer of the populace. He lags behind his brothers-in-law and, out of sight, summons Cavallo Di Wingo again, puts on the royal robes and rides to the battlefield. After defeating his enemies, Ishmael shouts at his brothers-in-law to open their shirts; and brands their chests with the Sultan's signet-ring. The youth rushes back to the place where he left the lame horse and rides back to the palace. Later, the Sultan organizes a banquet and invites the entire realm. Jogira also attends the feast, and saves her husband's seat for him, as per his request. Ishmael comes to the feast on Cavallo Di Wingo, but the horse lets him go on without him, for now he will disappear. He does; Ishmael enters the banquet and sits beside Jogira, who does not recognize him. The sultan's other sons-in-law boast about their victory in the war, when Ishmael interrupts their tale by demanding them to open their shirts. The sons-in-law reveal their branded chests; Ishmael shows the sultan his ring and tells the whole story.

==== Cape Verde ====
Ethnologue Elsie Clews Parsons collected and translated a Cape Verdian tale titled The Youth and his Horse, collected from an informant named Antonio Soares Rosa, from Fogo, Cape Verde. In this tale, a couple have no children, until the man procures a saib’ for a remedy. The man's wife gives birth to a boy. At the same time, a foal is born in the stables. Years later, the man dies while his son is at school, and the saib’ makes his moves on the widow. The boy's mother refuses his advances at first, but he convinces her to try to kill him: first, by placing a trap on the front door of their house; next, by poisoning his dinner; lastly, by putting poison under his pillow. With the horse's warnings, the boy escapes all attempts. The saib’ tells the boy's mother the horse is their only hindrance, and, to get rid of it, she is to feign illness and ask for its liver as remedy. The horse advises the boy that, before the execution, the boy is to ask to ride the horse three times, each time wearing one of his father's armours, then they must make they escape. The horse's plan works, and the boy escapes on the horse to another country. At a safe spot, the horse advises the boy (named Pedr’ Canarvalh’) to say his name is Billesmeu, and gives him a magical "strike-a-light" to summon it, then vanishes. Now calling himself Billesmeu, he goes to the king's house. On Sunday, the king goes to church, and Billesmeu uses the strike-a-light to dress in fine clothes and play with the princess in the garden while the king is away. The princess becomes fascinated by the mysterious youth, and is visited again on the next two Sundays. After the third time, she discovers that the knight becomes lowly Billesmeu, and acts in his defense whenever he is beaten up. Some time alter, the king goes blind, and only the water from a certain well can heal him. The king then sends four servants, Billesmeu included, on a quest. However, Billesmeu rides ahead of them and finds the well, fetching a bit of the water before the others then muddying the waters. He then uses the strike-a-light to change his form into that of an old man. The other three servants find the old man next to the well and ask to get the water. The old man (Billesmeu in disguise) agrees, as long as they undo their trousers and let him write his name on their buttocks. Later, the princess writes a note to her father that she is marrying Billesmeu. Then, war breaks out with the king's foe, Re’ Mouro Grande; Billesmeu rides his horse, fights three times against the enemy army, and steals their flags. At the end of the tale, he builds a large house and invites the king and the servants to a banquet, where he accuses the king of stealing a spoon and shows his mark on the servants' bodies. (Note: In a footnote, Parsons noted it to compare the Cape Verdian tale to the Egyptian tale collected by Spitta-Bey.)

== See also ==
- The Magician's Horse
- The Stallion Houssan
- Kibaraka
- Couche-Dans-La-Fange
- Abba Hundee
