= The Stallion Houssan =

Sudanese tale about a prince and his magical horse

Folk tale
- Name: The Stallion Houssan
- Also known as: Der Hengst Houssan
- Aarne–Thompson grouping: ATU 314 (Goldener)
- Region: Kordofan, Sudan
- Published in: Atlantis (Bd. 4): Märchen aus Kordofan by Leo Frobenius (1923)
- Related: The Story of the Prince and His Horse; Kibaraka; Abba Hundee; Donotknow; The Black Colt; The Tale of Clever Hasan and the Talking Horse

Der Hengst Houssan (English: "The Stallion Houssan") is a Sudanese folktale from Kordofan, first collected in German by ethnologist Leo Frobenius and published in 1923. It deals with a friendship between a king's son and a magic horse that are forced to flee for their lives due to the boy's step-mother, and reach another kingdom, where the prince adopts another identity.

It is classified in the international Aarne-Thompson-Uther Index as ATU 314, "Goldener". Although it differs from variants wherein a hero acquires golden hair, its starting sequence (persecution by the hero's stepmother) is considered by scholarship as an alternate opening to the same tale type. Variants have been collected from oral sources in Sudan.

== Publication ==
The tale was also translated to Serbo-Croatian as "Султанов син и његов ждребац" ("The Sultan's Son and His Foal").

== Summary ==
A sultan has a wife who gives birth to a son, while a mare in the stables gives birth to a male foal. The sultan's son and the foal grow up as best friends and companions. One day, the sultan's wife dies and he marries another woman. The second wife gives birth to her son and decides to get rid of her step-son. The sultan's first son, named Schatr Mohammed, (Note: According to Frobenius, the horse's name is Hossan, which also means 'horse'. The hero is also called Schatr Hossan in-story.) comes home after school and pets his horse. One day, the horse, named Houssan, cries and warns the boy that his step-mother intends to kill him. She first tries to poison the boy's food, then gives him a new clothe laced with magic, but he declines the offer on both occasions. A slave tells the step-mother of the deep affection there is between the boy and his horse, and deduces the horse is helping him. With a trusted doctor's aid, she feigns illness and demands the horse be put down and its liver given to her as cure. Schatr Mohammed learns of his stepmother's ploy from his horse, and tells his father he wants to ride it one last time.

The next day, the sultan allows his son to saddle and ride Houssan, while the stepmother secretly orders her slaves to attack the boy. Houssan takes its riders beyond his father's city gates, and rides through the desert to another city. They stop before the gates; the horse tells the boy to take off his rich garments and find shabby ones, and take seven hairs from its mane, which he can use to summon the horse whenever he wishes. Schatr Mohammed enters the city in his new identity, and finds work with the royal gardener as his assistant. One day, while there is a festival in the city, Schatr Mohammed seizes the opportunity to ride Houssan in secret, since everyone has gone to the festival. What he does not know, however, is that the sultan's seventh daughter watches him undress, take a bath and ride the horse. She begins to be fond of the gardener, and goes down to the garden to give him some food. After three years, the sultan's eldest daughter announces her plans to marry, and the sultan organizes a festival where his seven daughters are to select their husbands by throwing a kerchief to them. The sultan's six elder daughters choose respectable suitors, but the seventh does not throw her kerchief to any one the passing men. The sultan brings the gardener and the apprentice, and the princess gives him the kerchief. The sultan becomes enraged and exiles his daughter and her lowborn husband to the slaves' quarters.

One day, an enemy sultan arrives with his army and prepares to invade the city. The sultan summons his six sons-in-law to lead the army and protect the city. The battle is fierce and they barely resist, when Schatr Muhammed comes in riding his horse Houssan and makes the enemy army retreat. He then rides back to his wife, changes his clothes and feigns ignorance about recent events. The next day, the princess tells her husband that the sultan, her father, will go to the battlefield to discover the identity of their mysterious knight (Faris) and lead their army to victory. This becomes a fallible strategy, as the enemy king's troops close in on him to take him prisoner, but once more Schatr Mohammed appears in the nick of time to ward off the enemy army and defend his father-in-law. He is hurt in his arm, and the sultan closes the wound with a cloth. Schatr Mohammed races back to his wife in the city, now that the threat is over.

Later, the sultan announces that the Faris will inherit the kingdom, whoever he is. Schatr Mohammed goes to sleep in his shabby room, and his arm begins to bleed. His wife, the princess, notices the bleeding and rushes to her mother. The princess's mother goes to the slaves' quarters to heal him, and sees that the sultan's cloth is wrapped in his arm. His identity discovered, the princess's mother alerts the sultan, who summons him to his chambers as soon as he awakes. Schater Mohammed awakes, learns of this, and goes to his father-in-law's palace riding on Houssan.

== Analysis ==
=== Tale type ===
The tale is classified in the Aarne-Thompson-Uther Index as type ATU 314, "The Goldener": a youth with golden hair works as the king's gardener. The type may also open with the prince for some reason being the servant of an evil being, where he gains the same gifts, and the tale proceeds as in this variant.

==== Introductory episodes ====
Scholarship notes three different opening episodes to the tale type: (1) the hero becomes a magician's servant and is forbidden to open a certain door, but he does and dips his hair in a pool of gold; (2) the hero is persecuted by his stepmother, but his loyal horse warns him and later they both flee; (3) the hero is given to the magician as payment for the magician's help with his parents' infertility problem. Folklorist Christine Goldberg, in Enzyklopädie des Märchens, related the second opening to former tale type AaTh 532, "The Helpful Horse (I Don't Know)", wherein the hero is persecuted by his stepmother and flees from home with his horse. (Note: According to Stith Thompson's 1961 revision of the index, in type 532 the hero's helpful horse advises him to answer every question with the sentence "I don't know".)

American folklorist Barre Toelken recognized the spread of the tale type across Northern, Eastern and Southern Europe, but identified three subtypes: one that appears in Europe (Subtype 1), wherein the protagonist becomes the servant to a magical person, finds the talking horse and discovers his benefactor's true evil nature, and acquires a golden colour on some part of his body; a second narrative (Subtype 3), found in Greece, Turkey, Caucasus, Uzbekistan and Northern India, where the protagonist is born through the use of a magical fruit; and a third one (Subtype 2). According to Toelken, this Subtype 2 is "the oldest", being found "in Southern Siberia, Iran, the Arabian countries, Mediterranean, Hungary and Poland". In this subtype, the hero (who may be a prince) and the foal are born at the same time and become friends, but their lives are at stake when the hero's mother asks for the horse's vital organ (or tries to kill the boy to hide her affair), which motivates their flight from their homeland to another kingdom.

=== Motifs ===
Professor Anna Birgitta Rooth stated that the motif of the stepmother's persecution of the hero appears in tale type 314 in variants from Slavonic, Eastern European and Near Eastern regions. She also connected this motif to part of the Cinderella cycle, in a variation involving a male hero and his cow.

==== The suitor selection test ====
The motif of the princess throwing an apple (kerchief) to her suitor is indexed as motif H316, "Suitor test: apple thrown indicates princess' choice (often golden apple)". According to mythologist Yuri Berezkin and other Russian researchers, the motif is "popular" in Iran, and is also attested "in Central Europe, the Balkans, the Caucasus, the Near East, and Central Asia".

According to Turkologist Karl Reichl, types ATU 314 and ATU 502 contain this motif: the princess chooses her own husband (of lowly appearance) in a gathering of potential suitors, by giving him an object (e.g., an apple). However, he also remarks that the motif is "spread in folk literature" and may appear in other tale types.

Germanist Günter Dammann, in Enzyklopädie des Märchens, argued that Subtype 2 (see above) represented the oldest form of the Goldener narrative, since the golden apple motif in the suitor selection roughly appears in the geographic distribution of the same subtype.

==== The gardener hero ====
Swedish scholar Waldemar Liungman drew attention to a possible ancient parallel to the gardener hero of the tale type: in an account of the story of king Sargon of Akkad, he, in his youth, works as a gardener in a palace and attracts the attention of goddess Ishtar. According to scholars Wolfram Eberhard and Pertev Naili Boratav, this would mean that the motif is "very old" ("sehr alt") in the Near East.

According to Richard MacGillivray Dawkins, in the tale type, the hero as gardener destroys and restores the garden after he finds work, and, later, fights in the war. During the battle, he is injured, and the king dresses his wound with a kerchief, which will serve as token of recognition.

==== Quest for the remedy ====
A motif that appears in tale type 314 is the hero having to find a cure for the ailing king, often the milk of a certain animal (e.g., a lioness). According to scholar Erika Taube, this motif occurs in tales from North Africa to East Asia, even among Persian- and Arabic-speaking peoples. Similarly, Hasan M. El-Shamy noted that the quest for the king's remedy appears as a subsidiary event "in the Arab-Berber culture area". In addition, Germanist Gunter Dammann, in Enzyklopädie des Märchens, noted that the motif of the quest for the remedy appeared "with relative frequency" in over half of the variants that start with the Subtype 2 opening (stepmother's persecution of hero and horse).

== Variants ==
According to Germanist Günter Dammann, tale type 314 with the opening of hero and horse fleeing home extends from Western Himalaya and South Siberia, to Iran and the Arab-speaking countries in the Eastern Mediterranean. In addition, scholar Hasan El-Shamy stated that type 314 is "widely spread throughout north Africa", among Arabs and Berbers; in Sub-saharan Africa, as well as in Arabia and South Arabia.

=== Sudan ===
==== The Wonderful Horse (Kronenberg) ====
Anthropologist Andreas Kronenberg published a Sudanese tale titled Das Wunderpferd ("The Wonderful Horse"), collected in 1973 from a teller named 'Awad Muḥammad Halīl. In this tale, a woman gives birth to a son and dies. Her husband remarries, but his new wife hates her step-son. The man owns a horse and gives it to his son as a pet. After school, the boy plays with the horse. One day, the step-mother tries to kill the boy by poisoning his food, but the horse warns him against eating it. Some time later, a West African doctor and magician comes to town and tells the step-mother the boy is being helped by the horse, so her next course of action is to kill the animal. On the magician's advice, she is to feign illness and ask for the horse's liver as cure; after the horse dies, it will be easy to kill her step-son. The step-mother's plan works and the boy's father is convinced to kill the boy's pet. The horse, however, aware of the danger, reveals their plan to the boy and advises him to ask for golden garments, a golden bridle and a golden sword, and to be allowed to ride it one last time, in a north and a south direction. The boy follows the horse's instructions and seizes the opportunity to fly away from home. They land in another city; the horse gives the boy two of its hairs and advises him to find work, then leaves. The boy then takes shelter with a poor old woman that lives next to the king's garden and agrees to drive the oxen to move the water wheel. One day, when everyone has gone to the mosque to pray, the boy summons his horse by burning its hairs. The boy puts on the golden garments and rides the animal around the garden, stamping over the flowers - an event witnessed by the king's seventh and youngest daughter from her window. The princess then inquires her mother about their servant at the garden, and, taking an interest in him, bakes fresh bread for him, leaving a golden coin in the sauce for him to find. Some time later, the king goes with his daughters for a stroll in the garden, the eldest picks a banana, the middle one an orange and the youngest three limes of varied ripeness. She goes to the gardener's assistant and explains her plan: she will show the king the three lemons; the gardener's assistant is to come and tell the king they are an analogy for their marriageability. The boy follows the princess's plan, and the king summons a crowd for his daughters to choose their husbands by throwing kerchiefs to their suitors, the youngest choosing the gardener's assistant, to the king's dismay. The king furnishes his elder daughters with beautiful palaces and the youngest with a dovecote. The gardener's assistant summons his loyal horse and it helps him to clean their house. Next, war breaks out and the king sends his six sons-in-law to fight for the kingdom, and gives a lame horse for the gardener's assistant. While his brothers-in-law ride in front, he summons his loyal horse and, wielding a sword, defeats his father-in-law's enemies, in a war that goes on for seven years. Later, the king goes blind, and his doctors prescribe milk from a gazelle that has just milked for the first time. The king's six sons-in-law ride with fine horses, while the gardener's assistant is given another lame horse; while his brothers-in-law are away, he summons the magic horse and rides to the desert, stopping by a "Zeriba". The youth greets the Zeriba's owner, a sheik, and asks to borrow the place for a week, as well as an old gazelle and a young one, and disguises himself as an Arab. Some time later, his six brothers-in-law come and ask for some milk. After a meal, the "Arab" agrees to give them gazelle's milk, but tells a fake story they have to be branded on their backs. The brothers-in-law agree to it and unknowingly are given the old gazelle's milk. The six brothers-in-law return to the king to give him the wrong gazelle's milk, which does not restore his sight. The gardener's assistant gives the correct one to his wife to give it to her father, which restores his sight. The gardener's assistant then declares himself to be the mysterious knight who fought in the war, and his brothers-in-law as his slaves, due to the brands on their backs. After the king checks his claims, he makes his youngest daughter's husband the king.

==== The Wonderful Horse 1 (Massenbach) ====
Gertrud von Massenbach collected tale in the Dongolawi language with the title Das Wunderpferd ("The Wonderful Horse"). In this tale, a king marries a woman, they have a son and she dies. Later, his own son suggests he remarries, and points to their servant as potential wife. The king remarries. However, his second wife is having an illicit affair with another man, and kills their poultry (chickens, geese, doves and ducks) for him. The king's son has a horse. One day, when he goes back from school, the horse warns the boy his stepmother is killing their poultry to feed another man. With this information, the boy reports to his father, and steals the meat back. Later, the stepmother tells the king she wants to eat the horse's meat, but, since the animal belongs to his son and not to him, says he will ask his son about it when he returns from school. After the boy comes home, the king asks if he agrees to sacrifice the horse to feed his stepmother. The boy answers yes, but asks for a last ride on the horse. The next day, the king's son mounts the horse and gallops far away to another land, where he finds work as a gardener to a Sultan. The boy works in the "Sagjenarbeit", and lies underneath a tree. The story explains that the Sultan has seven daughters who spend some time in the garden collecting fruits (bananas, oranges and apples). The king's son summons his horse by rubbing two of its hairs it gave him, and rides around the garden - an event witnessed by the Sultan's youngest daughter, from her window. One day, she orders the overseer to bring them their seven geese. Later, when the princesses are gathering fruits in the garden, the youngest finds three pomegranates, two large and intact, and one small burst open. The girl asks her mother the meaning of this, and she explains that it is past time to marry her. The six elder daughters marry sons of ministers, of kings and of pashas, while the youngest wishes to marry a poor man, which is to be found in their kingdom. Failing that, the sultan orders his gardener to be brought before him. When he is brought before the princess, she throws him a towel to symbolize her choice of husband, and is married in a simple ceremony to the gardener. The princess and the gardener live in a storage room for onions. The youth then rubs his horse's two hairs, and his house turns into a castle for him and the princess. The Sultan's wife decides to pay her daughter and her husband a visit, and sees that their shabby house looks like a castle from the inside. Later, the Sultan summons his sons-in-law and equips them with weapons to fight in the war, while his seventh son-in-law is given a lame horse. The man on the lame horse actually kills the sultan's enemies, but his brothers-in-law boast their deed. The next day, another war breaks out, and the brothers-in-law take part in the fight, while the youth rides on his lame horse. Again, they boast of the deed of killing their enemies. At the end of the war, the sultan says he can recognize the true warrior who defeated his enemies, for he has a mark on his body. After confirming his suspicions, the king gives everything to him, and the princess and her husband live in the monarch's palace.

==== The Wonderful Horse 2 (Massenbach) ====
Massenbach collected a short tale in the Dongolawi language, which she titled as a variant of the tale of Wunderpferd ("Wonderful Horse"). In this tale, a man and a woman marry and have two children, a boy and a girl. The woman dies, and the man remarries, fathering another boy with his second wife. The two boys, half-brothers, go to herd their father's cattle in the desert. Meanwhile, the second wife brings food to her own son and her stepson, and cannot seem to tell them apart, so she consults with an old woman. The old woman advises her to bring the boys food and to lie down naked, so her own son will come cover her with her clothes. The old woman's suggestion works, and the second wife prepares a poisoned meal to her stepson to kill him. However, the boy avoids the danger when he is warned by his foal. Failing that plan, the stepmother feigns illness, and says that only the liver of a red foal can cure her. The boy's father tells him his stepmother ("Tante", in the German translation), needs the liver of his red foal, and the boy asks for a sword, a gun and a saddle. His request is fulfilled; he mounts the red foal and gallops far away from his father's lands. He arrives at the "Sagje" of a king, and goes to live with an old woman in her hut. His horse gives him two strands of its hair, which his rider has but to rub, and the horse will come to his aid. One day, the local king's worker sees the boy and goes to talk to the king to hire him to work in the Sagje. The local king has seven daughter, who walked in his garden. An enemy king goes to attack the king every year, and the latter has to beat the drums of war to gather his people - the tale ends.

==== The Mare (Ja'aliyin) ====
In a tale published by Sayed Hamid A. Hurreiz from a Ja'alin source with the title al farasa, translated as The Mare, a boy is born at the same time a mare gives birth to a foal. The boy's mother dies, and a neighbour offers to marry his father, but, after the marriage, she begins to have an affair with another man. The woman feeds extravagant dishes to her lover, like chicken, pastries and sweets, but meagre foods to her husband and her stepson, like soup and bread. Muḥammad (the boy's name) goes back from the khalwa and talks to the mare, which tells him that his stepmother has been making food for a lover, and directs him to where she hides the food. Muḥammad goes to retrieve the food, and his stepmother dismisses it as mere forgetfulness on her part. This repeats again, until the woman's lover tells her that the mare is helping the boy and exposing them, so they have to get rid of the animal. With her lover's advice, she feigns illness, and demands the mare's liver as remedy. Muḥammad's father falls for the trick and prepares to sacrifice the mare, but the boy asks him for one last ride on it. He seizes the opportunity to gallop away from home to another kingdom. Once there, the mare gives him some of its hairs, and he finds work under the local king as the gardener's assistant. One day, Muḥammad summons the mare and rides around the garden - an event witnessed by the youngest princess from her window. She falls in love with the gardener's assistant and secretly gives him gold by a servant. The princess then plucks seven oranges from her father's garden and sends them to the king as analogy for her and her sisters' marriageability. The king correctly interprets the meaning behind his daughter's actions, and issues an order to assemble eligible bachelors in a gathering, so that his daughters may choose husbands by throwing them a handkerchief. It happens thus: the six elder princesses throw their handkerchiefs to rich suitors, while the youngest throws her to the lowly gardener's assistant. The king feels insulted by this, so he moves his youngest daughter and her husband to an onion storeroom, while he gifts lavish palaces for the elder six. Some time later, the king falls ill, and only the milk of a deer that is bikir and the daughter of bikir is prescribed as remedy. Muḥammad's brothers-in-law ride into the wilderness to find the milk, but the youth summons the mare and asks it to build him a palace and draw all animals next to the construction. The brothers-in-law have no success during the hunt, but discover Muḥammad's menagerie and ask for the deer milk. Muḥammad agrees to a deal: the milk in exchange for branding their backs, but Muḥammad gives them old deer's milk. The deal done, the brothers-in-law return to the king and give him the wrong milk, while Muḥammad gives him the correct one and cures his father-in-law. Later, war breaks out, Muḥammad joins the fray to defend the kingdom: he vanquishes his father-in-law's enemies, but is hurt in battle, and flees. The king then looks for the mysterious knight and finds Muḥammad. The youth explains his brothers-in-law are his slaves, and is made king. Hurreiz classified the tale as types 532 and 314, and located analogues to the Ja'aliyyīn tale in Kordofan (Sudan), Egypt, among the Hausa, in the Swahili area, in Iraq, in Palestine, and among the Arabs in the United States.

==== The First Born of a First Born ====
Sudanese author Abdullah El Tayib published a Sudanese tale from Northern Sudan with the title The First Born of a First Born. In this tale, a sultan has two sons, one from each wife and both are alike and called Mohammed, but one of the boys' mother has died. The surviving co-wife despises her dead rival's son, and consults with an old wise woman how to distinguish both. The wise woman advises the co-wife to call for both boys, but dismiss the other Mohammed that is not her son, and mark his face. It happens thus, and she makes a cut in her son's forehead. Mohammed suspects his stepmother might be planning something against him and is on the lookout. Sometime later, the co-wife consults with the wise woman again how to kill her stepson without raising suspicion, and she gives some poison to be put in a calabash with milk for her stepson. The co-wife prepares the calabash for her son, who drinks it, then a second one with poisoned milk for her stepson for when he returns home. However, Mohammed kicks the calabash and spills the drink. Next, the co-wife consults with the old witch, who advises her to set her sights either on the gazelles or on Mohammed's beloved horse, Najibah, which is the descendant of the jinn horses of King Sulayman, the master of the djinn. Thus, she feigns illness and asks for the liver of Najibah's, her stepson's horse, as cure. The sultan asks his son to surrender his horse for his stepmother's sake, but the boy buys some time to plan his next step. At night, Mohammed suspects that his stepmother does indeed want to kill him, takes his horse and flees the kingdom. The following morning, the co-wife rejoices that her stepson is gone and that her own son Mohammed is made the rightful heir.

Back to the exiled prince, Mohammed rides into the wilderness and has for companions the gazelles that roam about, which he protects from predators. The tale then moves to a state ruled by a prince named Great Hamdan, who fathered seven beautiful daughters from two wives: the six elder princesses, Maymunah, Hamdunah, 'Arjunah, Layyunah, Al'Ajbah and Al Nafishah, and the youngest, Sit al Banat. Great Hamdan pities and loves the youngest out of the seven, for her mother died in childbirth, and wishes to find suitable husbands for them and a suitable successor for himself. Prince Mohammed goes to Great Hamdan's state and works there in the gardens, and, at night, summons Najibah to ride around the garden in the company of gazelles - an event only witnessed by the youngest princess, Sit al Banat. Sometime later, Great Hamdan announces he will find suitors for his daughters by gathering a crowd of eligible bachelors so that the princesses can throw handkerchiefs at their husbands of choice. The six elder princess toss their handkerchiefs to emirs and princes, save for Sit al Banat, who withdraws hers, since none of the men of the assemblage, either princes and noblemen, artisans, crafters, merchants or soldiers, is to her liking. A person says that Mohammed, the garden labourer. is missing, and Great Hamdan sends for him. As soon as Mohammed passes by the youngest princess, she throws him her handkerchief, signifying her choice. Great Hamdan agrees to her choice, but is disappointed she married a nobody. Thus, he gives extravagant ornaments to his elder six daughters, but silver jewels, some cotton clothes to Sit al Banat, a lame horse and blunt sword to Mohammed.

Disappointed with his daughter's choice, Great Hamdan falls ill, and the royal doctors consult with an Old Bedouin how to cure him. The latter prescribes the milk of the first born gazelle of the first born gazelle, AlBikir Bint Al Bikir. The six sons-in-law ride to the desert to find such a gazelle, to no avail, so they return and ask the Old Bedouin how to find the animal. The Old Bedouin reveals they can find a person under a shady tree, but who will set hard conditions. The six sons-in-law ride again and find a Bedouin shepherd under a tree, who is actually Mohammed, their lowly brother-in-law, under a disguise. The false Bedouin says he has the milk, but wants pieces of silver and to brand the six men on their backs with a seal to mark them as his father's slaves. A deal is made, and the six sons-in-law return with a gourd of milk to Great Hamdan. Mohammed appears behind them on the lame horse and brings the right milk. At first, Great Hamdan refuses to drink the milk Mohammed brought, but is convinced by his cadette and regains his health. Soon enough, he learns of upcoming news of wars with other warring sultans and rides into battle with his princely sons-in-law. The people then clamour for lowly Mohammed to join them, since he brought the milk. However, the six sons-in-law are defeated and flee, leaving Great Hamdan's tent unprotected. Mohammed summons his jinn horse, Al Najibah, descendant of the jinn mares and stallions of King Suleyman, dons his armour and rides into the battle to protect his father-in-law, defeating the enemy armies. Time and again, the six sons-in-law flee the battlefield, leaving their father-in-law unguarded, save for the miraculous appearance of the mysterious knight.

Thus, Great Hamdan decides to look into the identity of the mysterious knight, since he suspects he is neither of his six other sons-in-law. Another war breaks out, the six princes run away, and the mysterious knight rides to save his kingdom. Great Hamdan injures the knight in the arm and gives him a handkerchief to dress the wound - which will serve to clue Great Hamdan to his true identity. After the battle, the six sons-in-law boast of their false victories, when Great Hamdan shuts them up and sends for Mohammed. The lowly gardener is brought before him, wearing the king's handkerchief on his arm. Great Hamdan realizes Mohammed was truly their saviour and asks him to appear before him with his noble horse. It happens thus. Mohammed then indicates that his six brothers-in-law are his slaves, for the brands on their backs. Great Hamdan congratulates Mohammed for his brave deeds and Sit al Banat for her choice of husband, and makes Mohammed his successor.

==== Other tales ====
Egyptologist Hans Abel collected an untitled tale in the Fadicha dialect of Nubian from his then servant Mohammed Abdu Hamadûn, in 1910, in Ermenne. In this tale, a man marries a woman, but she is childless. The man also has a mare. One day, the woman sits with others and makes a vow that, if she becomes pregnant and their mare foals, she will name the boy Šatirhassan and raise him and the colt, hold a feast, and decorate the horse with emerald bridle, amethyst saddle, stirrup of silver and saddle of gold, and make a course from north and south. In time, the Lord of the World grants her prayer, and the mare also foals. The woman sends the boy to school and raises the foal. However, she dies, and a neighbour woman helps raise the boy, Šatirhassan. The woman convinces Šatirhassan to let his father marry her, and she becomes his stepmother. The morning after the marriage, the woman prepares some porridge for the family, but poisons Šatirhassan's dish so she could have her husband's property. She welcomes the boy and bids him to eat the food she cooked. Šatirhassan's horse neighs to alert the boy and warns him not to eat from the dish, but from the pot, since his plate is poisoned. The boy eats from the pot, but leaves the other unpoisoned dish for his father. Next, she makes a dish of cooked eggs and poisons Šatirhassan's plate, while they wait for the boy to come from school. The horse neighs again and tells Šatirhassan the eggs are poisoned, so he goes to his uncle's house instead of going home that night. The stepmother learns Šatirhassan has gone with some boys to his uncle's house, so she throws away the poisoned eggs on the pretense there was a dead rat in the food. Thirdly, the woman says she wants to buy some silk garments for Šatirhassan, buys them and dips them in poison. Šatirhassan comes back from school and talks to his horse, which warns him the clothes his stepmother bought him are poisonous, so the boy is to ask his uncle to boy some for him. It happens thus, and the stepmother is furious her attempts failed. She complains with a female neighbour about her plans and the neighbour reveals the horse is helping Šatirhassan, so she feigns illness and places some eggshells to pretend her bones are cracking, and asks to cook and eat the heart of a horse as remedy. Šatirhassan's father falls for the trick and decides to sacrifice his son's horse. Šatirhassan agrees to let the horse serve as his stepmother's cure, but mounts on him during the event and rides towards the north, then to the south.

Šatirhassan and the horse reach a desert, and the horse tells him to don shabby clothes, and go to the nearby village, gives him some of its hairs, and gallops away. He looks for a job and the local sultan's gardener takes him in as his assistant. One day, Šatirhassan makes a mistake, and is chastised by the gardener. While the gardener is away, Šatirhassan burns the horse's hairs to summon it, and asks the horse to destroy the flowers in the garden, which the animal does by stamping on the ground. The local sultan's youngest and seventh daughter sees the boy and falls in love with him, then prepares a cake for him the following morning. The princess gives the cake with some gold inside to the head gardener, which he keeps to himself. On the second day, she gives some poultry stuffed with gold, emerald and amethysts, which the head gardener also keeps to himself. The sultan then asks the princesses to bring some fire, and he realizes the fire the cadette brought is the smallest. The monarch then arranges a feast and orders people to pass in front of the palace for the princesses to choose their husbands by throwing a kerchief to their suitors of choice. The elder six choose theirs, save for the youngest, who asks if there is anyone absent from the gathering. They bring the gardener's assistant and the youngest princess throws her kerchief to him. The sultan and his wife are so furious they become blind, move the princesses to castles and the cadette to a cattle shed. Later, Šatirhassan summons his horse and rides to the wilderness, where he asks the animal to build him a castle for him by stomping on the ground. Soon enough, Šatirhassan welcomes a party of six men (his brothers-in-law) and six women (the princesses), who tell him the sultan sent them for a gazelle with a nephrite inside it that can cure his blindness. Šatirhassan agrees to give them the gazelles, in exchange for Šatirhassan branding their backs with a seal saying that the brothers-in-law are Šatirhassan's parents' slaves. A deal is made, and the brothers-in-law depart with the game, but none of the gazelles contain the nephrite to cure the monarch. Šatirhassan returns to the city with a lame mount and the correct gazelle, but the sultan refuses to have him. Šatirhassan tells the sultan to open the gazelle he brought: they find the nephrite and heal the king.

Šatirhassan returns to the cattle shed and his wife complains that she saw something beautiful in him, so they do not have to live in such poor conditions. Šatirhassan asks his wife what she wants, and she replies she wants a palace larger than her father's, with a seraglio, a mosque, a minaret, and a river with boats. Šatirhassan summons his horse, which provides the couple the palace with especifications overnight. The following morning, the crier prepares to make the calls for prayer, when he sees the newly-built palace and informs the sultan. The sultan brings the vizier to pay a visit to the new palace and they meet Šatirhassan, who says he has come for his slaves which bear a branded seal on their backs. The boy then points to the sultan's six daughters and six brothers-in-law, who deny being slaves, but Šatirhassan reveals that they made a contract to have them and orders the princesses and their husbands to bare their shoulders, revealing the seals. Šatirhassan then tells his lifestory to his father-in-law, who makes Šatirhassan his successor and forces his daughters and sons-in-law to serve him and the youngest princess.

== See also ==
- The Black Colt
- The Wonderful Sea-Horse
- The Story of the Prince and His Horse
- The Tale of Clever Hasan and the Talking Horse
- Adventures of a Boy
- Kibaraka
- Couche-Dans-La-Fange
