= Abba Hundee =

Oromo folk tale from Ethiopia

Abba Hundee is an East African tale from the Horn of Africa, sourced to the Oromo Tulama of Choa. It deals with a friendship between a king's son and a magic horse who are forced to flee for their lives because of the boy's stepmother, and reach another kingdom, where the prince adopts another identity.

It is classified in the international Aarne-Thompson-Uther Index as ATU 314, "Goldener". Although it differs from variants wherein a hero acquires golden hair, its starting sequence (persecution by the hero's stepmother) is considered by scholarship as an alternate opening to the same tale type. Variants have been collected from oral sources in Sudan.

== Source ==
According to the collector, Christian Bader, the story of Abba Hundee belongs to the folklore of the Oromo Tulama of Choa. Bader also noted that the tale was "remarkably close" to tales collected from Central Europe by the Brothers Grimm in the 19th century.

== Summary ==
In this tale, a négus and his wife have a son, to whom they gift a young foal. Years later, his mother (or "mère du sang", referring to a biological mother) dies, so the négus remarries. The second wife, his stepmother ("or mère du pain", referring to the stepmother) begins to dislike her stepson, so she prepares a potent poison and gives it to a cook that is preparing the prince's repast, dowsing his millet beer with the concoction. The prince crosses the meadow to talk to his colt, who warns him not to touch the beer. Thus, the prince avoids drinking the beer and eats his flour pancakes made of t'ef (which is the Poa eragrostis). (Note: According to Christian Bader, the t'ef is the Poa eragrostis, a small cereal originating from the Abyssinian high plateaus.) The stepmother questions the prince, and he lies that he is not thirsty.

Suspecting someone warned the prince, the queen meets a sorcerer (qallu), who divines that the prince's newest horse, given by his father, is helping the prince for it can talk, so she has to feign illness and ask the négus that the only remedy, as Waaqa has shown her, is the horse's flesh. The queen tricks her husband, the négus, who explains to the prince his mother of blood has died, and now his "mother of bread" is dying and needs the horse's flesh. Prince Abba agrees to let the horse be sacrificed, but asks to be allowed a last ride on it. The prince dons his gold-embroidered clothes, saddles the horse with a gold-embroidered mantle and rides up north. The horse gallops in a single day a hundred day journey, and they reach another land. The prince lets the horse graze in a nearby forest, while he dons rags and goes to talk to the local negus (king) to be offered a job. Thus, prince Abba Hundee works as a soldier for the négus.

Years later, Abba Hundee takes the chance to slip away from the realm to meet his horse and ride around with him. One day, the négus's youngest daughter trails behind him and witnesses as the lowly soldier dons rich garments and rides around on a draped horse. She returns home and keeps the secret to herself. Soon enough, the local négus decides to marry his three daughters: he gives each of them a citron and tells them to toss it to their husbands of choice. The elder princesses choose husbands of high rank, while the youngest princess chooses the lowly soldier. The négus questions the cadette's choice, who insists that she will marry the soldier, and no one else. For this, the négus, gives her daughter a ramshackled hut and orders that she is given millet beer and sorghum flatbread as her meals.

The prince and his wife suffer the mockery of the court and their destitute conditions for some time, until war breaks out. Abba Hundee joins the soldiers in his raggedy appearance and mounted on a lame mount, to the army's mockery. Out of sight, he rushes to his loyal horse, doffs the rags, dons the golden attire, and galops towards the battlefield, where he slays many foes and sows panic among the enemies. Impressed with the mysterious personage's performance, the négus, his father-in-law, throws him a scarf, and he vanishes from the battlefield. Abba Hundee dismisses his horse and returns to his lowly disguise in rags and riding the lame mount, then goes to join the others. His father-in-law's army mocks him that he arrived late for the battle. As for the Négus, he tries to discover the identity of the mysterious knight in golden raiments that brought him victory, and invites the nobles, but none can produce the négus's scarf.

Later, the négus becomes blind and the royal doctor prescribes she-camel milk as remedy. The négus sends his high-ranking sons-in-law after the remedy, and both depart south, to the land of the camels. Abba Hundee takes his horse and returns to his home kingdom, where he learns his father died some time ago. He is recognized by the clergy and nobility, and executes his stepmother, then waits for his brothers-in-law. The brothers-in-law arrive and is welcomed by Abba Hundee, who do not recognize him and ask him if they could have the she-camel milk as remedy for their ruler. Abba Hundee agrees to let them have the milk, in exchange for marking their bodies with a tattoo. Abba Hundee gives them camel sperm instead of milk and tattoes the words "property of négus Abba Hundee" on their backs, then allows the brothers-in-law to return to their kingdom. They administer the false remedy on the king, who is still blind, when Abba Hundee appears, wearing rags, with the she-camel milk.

The court mocks Abba Hundee and the king doubts a lowly soldier has brought the milk, when his noble sons-in-law have failed. Abba Hundee insists his father-in-law takes the wineskin he is offering, and applies the remedy on his eyes, recovering his sight. Abba Hundee then reveals he is the ruler of the southern kingdom and produces the sash the king gave to the mysterious knight during the war, thus proving that Abba Hundee was indeed the saviour at the battlefield. Abba Hundee asks the négus to look after his wife, then returns home to gather his armies and march triumphantly to his father-in-law's kingdom, where they have a large feast. After the celebration, the négus says his kingdom cannot feed two armies, and bids Abba Hundee take his army and go back to his kingdom. Before he leaves, Abba Hundee mentions he has two runaway slaves, and points to his brothers-in-law, who reveal their tattooed backs. Abba Hundee annouces he will take both men as his slaves back to his kingdom. That is Abba Hundee's revenge, and the tale ends.

== Analysis ==
=== Tale type ===
The tale is classified in the Aarne-Thompson-Uther Index as type ATU 314, "The Goldener": a youth with golden hair works as the king's gardener. The type may also open with the prince for some reason being the servant of an evil being, where he gains the same gifts, and the tale proceeds as in this variant.

==== Introductory episodes ====
Scholarship notes three different opening episodes to the tale type: (1) the hero becomes a magician's servant and is forbidden to open a certain door, but he does and dips his hair in a pool of gold; (2) the hero is persecuted by his stepmother, but his loyal horse warns him and later they both flee; (3) the hero is given to the magician as payment for the magician's help with his parents' infertility problem. Folklorist Christine Goldberg, in Enzyklopädie des Märchens, related the second opening to former tale type AaTh 532, "The Helpful Horse (I Don't Know)", wherein the hero is persecuted by his stepmother and flees from home with his horse. (Note: According to Stith Thompson's 1961 revision of the index, in type 532 the hero's helpful horse advises him to answer every question with the sentence "I don't know".)

American folklorist Barre Toelken recognized the spread of the tale type across Northern, Eastern and Southern Europe, but identified three subtypes: one that appears in Europe (Subtype 1), wherein the protagonist becomes the servant to a magical person, finds the talking horse and discovers his benefactor's true evil nature, and acquires a golden colour on some part of his body; a second narrative (Subtype 3), found in Greece, Turkey, Caucasus, Uzbekistan and Northern India, where the protagonist is born through the use of a magical fruit; and a third one (Subtype 2). According to Toelken, this Subtype 2 is "the oldest", being found "in Southern Siberia, Iran, the Arabian countries, Mediterranean, Hungary and Poland". In this subtype, the hero (who may be a prince) and the foal are born at the same time and become friends, but their lives are at stake when the hero's mother asks for the horse's vital organ (or tries to kill the boy to hide her affair), which motivates their flight from their homeland to another kingdom.

=== Motifs ===
Professor Anna Birgitta Rooth stated that the motif of the stepmother's persecution of the hero appears in tale type 314 in variants from Slavonic, Eastern European and Near Eastern regions. She also connected this motif to part of the Cinderella cycle, in a variation involving a male hero and his cow.

==== The suitor selection test ====
The motif of the princess throwing a citron to her suitor is indexed as motif H316, "Suitor test: apple thrown indicates princess' choice (often golden apple)". According to mythologist Yuri Berezkin and other Russian researchers, the motif is "popular" in Iran, and is also attested "in Central Europe, the Balkans, the Caucasus, the Near East, and Central Asia".

According to Turkologist Karl Reichl, types ATU 314 and ATU 502 contain this motif: the princess chooses her own husband (of lowly appearance) in a gathering of potential suitors, by giving him an object (e.g., an apple). However, he also remarks that the motif is "spread in folk literature" and may appear in other tale types.

Germanist Günter Dammann, in Enzyklopädie des Märchens, argued that Subtype 2 (see above) represented the oldest form of the Goldener narrative, since the golden apple motif in the suitor selection roughly appears in the geographic distribution of the same subtype.

==== Branding the brothers-in-law ====
According to German scholars Günther Damman and Kurt Ranke, another motif that appears in tale type ATU 314 is the hero branding his brothers-in-law during their hunt. Likewise, Ranke stated that the hero's branding represented a mark of his ownership over his brothers-in-law.

Ranke located the motif in the Orient and in the Mediterranean. In the same vein, Hungarian professor Ákos Dömötör, in the notes to tale type ATU 314 in the Hungarian National Catalogue of Folktales (MNK), remarked that the motif was a "reflection of the Eastern legal custom", which also appears in the Turkic epic Alpamysh.

== See also ==
- The Black Colt
- The Story of the Prince and His Horse
- Kibaraka
- Couche-Dans-La-Fange
- The Stallion Houssan
