= Erika Taube =

German ethnologist

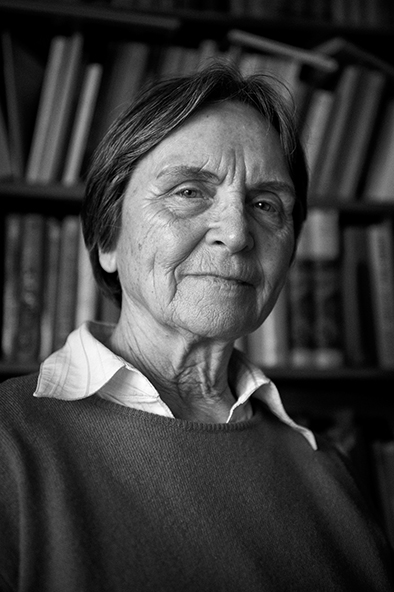
- Taube in 2010
- Born: Erika Taube; November 22, 1933; Nossen, Nazi Germany
- Died: July 3, 2020 (aged 86); Markkleeberg, Germany
- Occupations: Ethnologist, folklorist

Erika Taube (November 22, 1933 – July 3, 2020) was a German ethnologist and folklorist specialized in the study of Central Asian cultures, particularly those of Turkic and Mongolian peoples. Her work focused on the diverse forms of oral tradition in Central Asia from an ethnological perspective, with a focus on comparative fairy tale research.

== Career ==
Taube studied Sinology and Tibetology at the University of Leipzig from 1952 to 1957, also spending time in Beijing in 1957/58. She then became a research assistant at the Leipzig East Asian Institute. In 1964, she received her doctorate with a dissertation on Mongolian fairy tale material. From 1992, together with her husband, Prof. Manfred Taube, she was instrumental in ensuring that Central Asian Studies (Tibetology, Mongolian Studies) at the University of Leipzig could once again be part of the canon of subjects in the newly founded Institute for Indology and Central Asian Studies. She retired in 1998. Taube passed away on in 2020 at the age of 86.

== Research and contributions ==
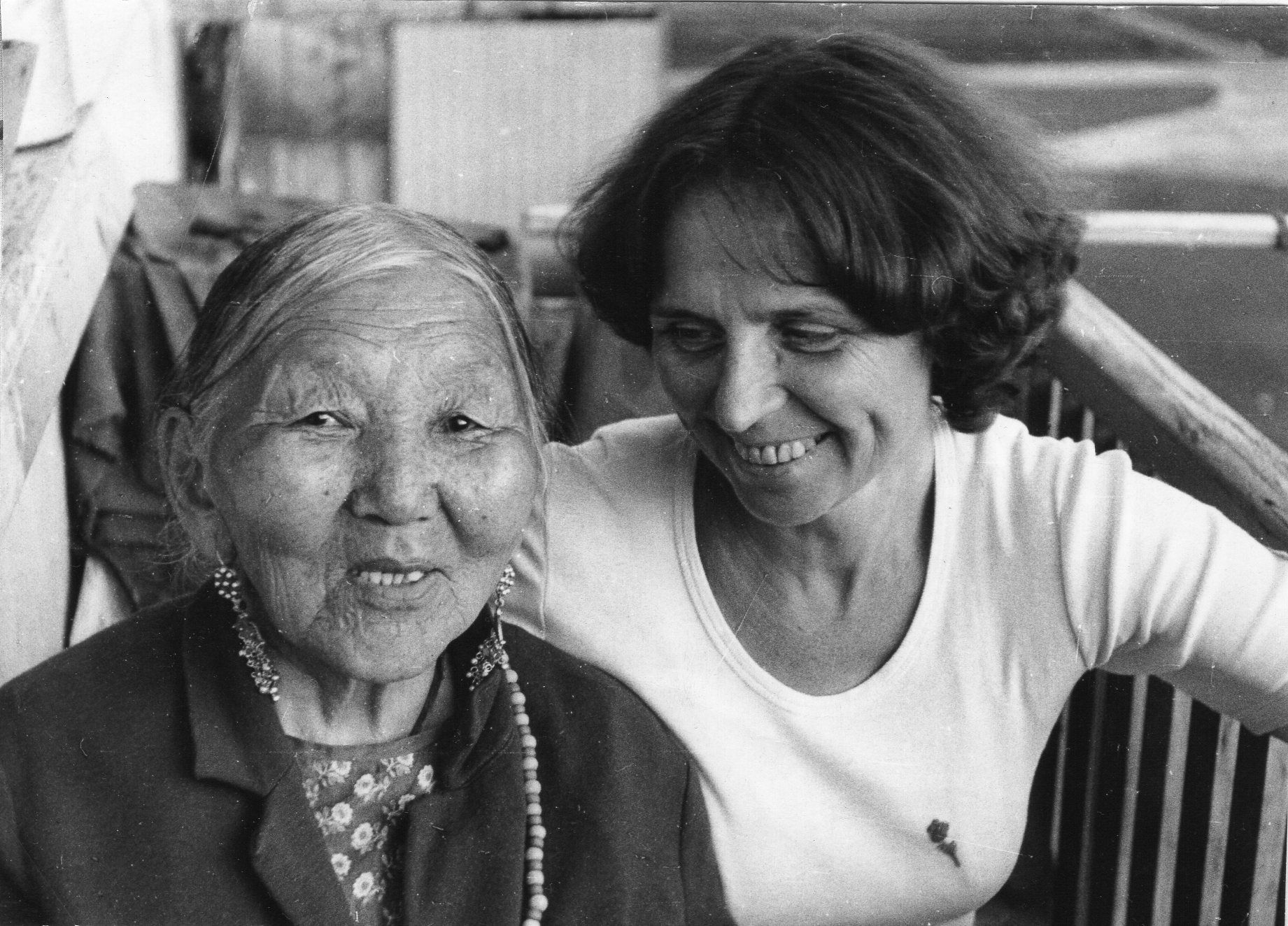
Erika Taube with an Altaitulivin in 1982.

Erika Taube's research centered on the collection, documentation, and analysis of ethnographic and folkloric materials from Central Asia. A significant part of her work involved fieldwork among the Tuvans, a Turkic people living in southern Mongolia. She documented their narratives and customs, making them accessible to a wider audience. Her key contributions include:

- Extensive collection of Tuvan folktales, songs, and traditions, providing valuable insights into their cultural heritage.
- Analysis of tale types and motifs in Central Asian folklore, particularly in Turkic-Mongolian traditions.
- Documentation of various aspects of Tuvan life, including their religious ideas, everyday customs, hunting practices, and traditional clothing.

Taube donated her fieldwork materials and recordings to Tuvan academics at the Tuvan State University in Kyzyl.

== Selected publications ==
=== Articles ===
- Taube, Erika (1980). "Gemeinsamkeiten Zentralasiatischer Nomadenlieder". Acta Orientalia Academiae Scientiarum Hungaricae. 34 (1/3): 287–296. ISSN 0001-6446.
- Taube, Erika (1990-12-01). "Ein Quell für Fragen zu Folkloretraditionen und Glaubensvorstellungen nicht nur der Sibe-Mandschuren". Orientalistische Literaturzeitung (in German). 85 (1–6): 131–136. doi:10.1524/olzg.1990.85.16.131. ISSN 2196-6877.
- "Warum erzählen Erzähler manchmal nicht?: Vom Erzählen und seiner Beziehung zum Numinosen". Studia Uralo-altaica. 39: 351–363. 1997.

=== Books ===
- Oelschlägel, Anett C.; Taube, Erika; Nentwig, Ingo; Taube, Jakob, eds. (2005). "Roter Altai, gib dein Echo!": Festschrift für Erika Taube zum 65. Geburtstag. Leipzig: Leipziger Univ.-Verl. ISBN 978-3-86583-062-3.
- Review of Volksmärchen der Mongolen. Aus dem Mongolischen, Russischen und Chinesischen übersetzt und herausgegeben.
- Tuwinische Folkoretexte aus dem Altai: (Cengel ; Westmongolei) Kleine Formen. Turcologica. Wiesbaden: Harrassowitz. 2008. ISBN 978-3-447-05636-6.

=== Chapters ===
- Taube, Erika (1995). "Formen und Funktionen mündlicher Traditionen bei den Tuwinern im Altai". In Hesissig, Walther (ed.). Formen und Funktion mündlicher Tradition: Vorträge eines Akademiesymposiums in Bonn, Juli 1993 (in German). Wiesbaden: VS Verlag für Sozialwissenschaften. pp. 145–155. doi:10.1007/978-3-322-84033-2_11. ISBN 978-3-322-84033-2.
- Taube, Erika (2020-08-10). "Archaeological Finds Reflecting Folklore-Motifs from Central Asian Traditions". In Pang, Tatiana A.; Winkelhane, Gerd; Raschmann, Simone-Christiane (eds.). Unknown Treasures of the Altaic World in Libraries, Archives and Museums: 53rd Annual Meeting of the Permanent International Altaistic Conference, St. Petersburg, July 25–30, 2010. Walter de Gruyter GmbH & Co KG. pp. 138–148. ISBN 978-3-11-220889-2.
- Taube, Erika (2022-08-01). "Aspects and Results of Investigating Tuvinian Folklore". In Barthel, Günter; Rathmann, Lothar (eds.). The Arab World and Asia between Development and Change: Dedicated to the XXXIst International Congress of Human Sciences in Asia and North Africa. De Gruyter. pp. 267–278. doi:10.1515/9783112619681-023. ISBN 978-3-11-261968-1.

== Awards ==
In 1996, Erika Taube's scientific work was honored with the Friedrich Weller Prize of the Saxon Academy of Sciences and Humanities.
