= Hasan M. El-Shamy =

Egyptian-born American folklorist (1938–2026)

Hasan M. El-Shamy (June 21, 1938 – August 16, 2026) was an Egyptian-American folklorist and academic. He was a professor of folklore (folkloristics) in the Department of Folklore and Ethnomusicology, the Department of Near Eastern Languages and Cultures, and the African Studies Program at Indiana University. He received a B.A. with honors in Arabic and Islamic studies from Ain-Shams University in Cairo, Egypt in 1959. He then completed an intensive graduate program in psychology and education from Ain-Shams (Heliopolis) University in 1959–1960. Later he received an M.A. in folklore from Indiana University in 1964, as well as a Ph.D. in folklore with interdisciplinary training in folklore, psychology, and anthropology from Indiana University in 1967. At the time of his death, El-Shamy was retired and professor emeritus at Indiana University Bloomington.

El-Shamy taught as an assistant professor of sociology and anthropology for a year (1967–1968) at Morehead State University before becoming the director of the archives at the Folklore Center of the Ministry of Culture in Cairo, Egypt, a role that he held from 1967 to 1972. During this period he was also an assistant professor of sociology and anthropology at The American University in Cairo. In 1972 he returned to Indiana University as a member of the faculty in the Folklore Institute (presently known as the Department of Folklore and Ethnomusicology). He has held numerous roles at Indiana University, including service as the director of graduate studies for the folklore program. He has held many visiting posts away from Indiana University, including as visiting professor at the Institute of Advanced Studies in Anthropology, National Museum of Ethnology, Japan (Osaka) in 2002, as well as a visiting professor in the department of sociology at Tanta University, Egypt in 2003.

El-Shamy's research publications introduced a number of innovative approaches to the study of traditional cultures in general and Arabic communities in particular. Among these are the concepts and research methodology of "Folkloric Behavior," and "The Brother-Sister Syndrome" in Arab family life and psychological practices. Some of his research interests included religion, myth and ritual, narrative folk poetry, typology and classification, kinship and folklore, which he has analyzed through comparative, ethnographic and psychological approaches. He has written numerous articles and books on African, Arabic and Middle Eastern folk narratives.

In light of his contributions to the fields of Folklore and Middle Eastern studies, El-Shamy was awarded a number of honors, including the Senior Scholar Award from Institute of Advanced Studies in Anthropology, National Museum of Ethnology, Osaka, Japan in 2002. He also has been a Fulbright Fellow (1960–1961, 1987–1988) and has been elected as a Fellow of the American Folklore Society (2006).

El-Shamy died in Bloomington, Indiana on August 16, 2026, at the age of 88.

== Representative works ==
- Hasan El-Shamy (1980). Folktales of Egypt. Chicago: University of Chicago Press.
- Hasan El-Shamy (1995). Folk Traditions in the Arab World: A Guide to Motif Classification. 2 Vols. Bloomington: Indiana University Press.
- Hasan El-Shamy (1999). Tales Arab Women Tell: And the Behavioral Patterns They Portray. Bloomington: Indiana University Press.
- Hasan El-Shamy (2004). Types of the Folktale in the Arab World: A Demographically Oriented Tale-Type Index. Bloomington: Indiana University Press.
- El-Shamy, Hasan (2004). "Siblings in the Arabian Nights". Marvels and Tales. 18 (2): 170–186. doi:10.1353/mat.2004.0030. S2CID 144016541.
- Jane Garry and Hasan El-Shamy, eds. (2005). Archetypes and Motifs in Folklore and Literature: A Handbook. Armonk, NY: M.E. Sharpe.
- Hasan El-Shamy (2006). Motif Index of The Thousand and One Nights. Bloomington: Indiana University Press.
- Hasan El-Shamy (2008). Religion Among the Folk in Egypt. Westport, CT: Praeger.
