= Barre Toelken =

American folklorist

- Born: John Barre Toelken; June 15, 1935; Enfield, Massachusetts
- Died: November 9, 2018 (aged 83); Logan, Utah
- Spouse: Midori "Miiko"
- Children: 6

John Barre Toelken (/ˈbæri ˈtoʊlkən/; June 15, 1935 – November 9, 2018) was an American folklorist, noted for his study of Native American material and oral traditions.

== Early life and education ==
Barre Toelken was born in Enfield, Massachusetts, to parents John and Sylvia Toelken. The family later moved to Springfield. He began to attend Utah State University in 1953, where he graduated with a bachelor's degree in English. Toelken completed a master's degree in English literature from Washington State University, followed by a doctorate from the University of Oregon.

== Career ==
Toelken began his teaching career at the University of Oregon in 1966. During nearly twenty years at the university, Toelken would serve as director for both Folklore and Ethnic Studies and also the Randall V. Mills Archives of Northwest Folklore. Toelken returned to Utah State in 1985: there he would serve as the director of the Folklore Program and co-director of the Fife Folklore Conference.

Toelken was known for his research into Navajo folklore, namely with the Yellowman family. Decades later, Toelken destroyed most of the physical records originating from his work with the Yellowman family, choosing to leave a set of cassette tapes with members of the family, not within an archive.

== Recognition ==
Over the course of his career, Toelken was president of the American Folklore Society from 1977 to 1978, and edited the Journal of American Folklore and Western Folklore. The American Folklore Society granted Toelken fellowship in 1981. He received four of the association's major awards: the Américo Paredes Prize and the Chicago Folklore Prize, both in 2007, followed by the Kenneth Goldstein Award for Lifetime Academic Leadership and the Lifetime Scholarly Achievement Award, in 2011 and 2016, respectively.

Toelken also served on the boards of a number of organisations, including the American Folklife Center of the Library of Congress, the National Endowment for the Arts Folklife Program, the Western Folklife Center, Utah Arts Council, and the International Ballad Commission.

== Later years ==
Toelken died in Logan, Utah, on November 9, 2018, aged 83.

== Selected publications ==
- Toelken, J. Barre (April 1959). "The Ballad of the 'Mountain Meadows Massacre'". Western Folklore. 18 (2): 169–172. doi:10.2307/1496486. JSTOR 1496486.
- Toelken, Barre (1976). "The 'Pretty Languages' of Yellowman: Genre, Mode, and Texture in Navaho Coyote Narratives". Folklore Genres. pp. 145–170. doi:10.7560/724150-010. ISBN 978-0-292-73509-5. S2CID 192956069.
- Toelken, Barre. (1979) Dynamics of Folklore. Boston: Houghton Mifflin Co. OCLC 490869905.
- Iwasaka, Michiko; Toelken, Barre (1994). Ghosts and the Japanese: cultural experience in Japanese death legends. Utah State University Press. ISBN 978-0-87421-179-5. OCLC 30518351.
- Toelken, Barre (1995). Morning dew and roses: nuance, metaphor, and meaning in folksongs. University of Illinois Press. ISBN 978-0-252-02134-3. OCLC 807804619.
- Toelken, Barre (1998). "The Yellowman Tapes, 1966-1997". The Journal of American Folklore. 111 (442): 381–391. doi:10.2307/541046. JSTOR 541046.
- Toelken, Barre (1998). "The End of Folklore. The 1998 Archer Taylor Memorial Lecture". Western Folklore. 57 (2/3): 81–101. doi:10.2307/1500214. JSTOR 1500214.
- Evers, Larry; Toelken, Barre (2001). Native American oral traditions: collaboration and interpretation. Utah State University Press. ISBN 978-0-87421-415-4. OCLC 884003618.
- Toelken, Barre (2003). Anguish Of Snails: Native American Folklore in the West. University Press of Colorado. doi:10.2307/j.ctt46nqrg. ISBN 978-0-87421-555-7. JSTOR j.ctt46nqrg. S2CID 96454321.
- Toelken, Barre (2003). "The Heritage Arts Imperative". The Journal of American Folklore. 116 (460): 196–205. doi:10.1353/jaf.2003.0033. JSTOR 4137898. S2CID 162266860.
- Toelken, Barre (2003). "Silence, Ellipsis, and Camouflage in the English-Scottish Popular Ballad". Western Folklore. 62 (1/2): 83–96. JSTOR 1500447.
- Toelken, Barre (2004). "Beauty Behind Me; Beauty Before (AFS Address)". The Journal of American Folklore. 117 (466): 441–445. doi:10.1353/jaf.2004.0103. JSTOR 4137719. S2CID 161176797.
