= Iranian folklore =

Folk traditions that have evolved in Greater Iran

Iranian folklore encompasses the folk traditions that have evolved in Greater Iran.

== Oral legends ==
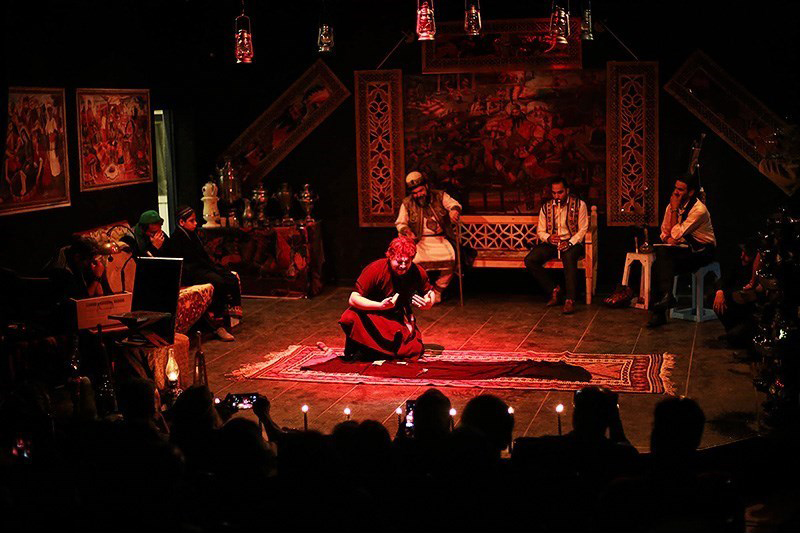
A storytelling performance of the stories of Šāhnāme, the Iranian national epic, in Qazvin, Iran

=== Folktales ===
Storytelling has an important presence in Iranian culture. In classical Iran, minstrels performed for their audiences at royal courts and in public theaters. A minstrel was referred to by the Parthians as gōsān in Parthian, and by the Sasanians as huniyāgar in Middle Persian. Since the time of the Safavid dynasty, storytellers and poetry readers have appeared at coffeehouses.

The following are a number of folktales known to the people of Iran:

- Kadu Qelqelezan ("Rolling Pumpkin")
- Māh-pišāni (fa) ("Moon-brow")
- Nāranj o Toranj ("Bitter Orange and Bergamot Orange")
- Sarmā ye Pirezan ("Old Woman's Cold"), a period in the month of Esfand, at the end of winter, during which an old woman's flock is not impregnated. She goes to Moses and asks for an extension of the cold winter days, so that her flock might copulate.
- Šangul o Mangul ("Shangul and Mangul")
- Xāle Suske ("Auntie Cockroach")
- The Wonderful Sea-Horse
- The Black Colt
- The Horse of the Cloud and the Wind

Below is a list of historical anthologies and epics that contain Iranian folktales.

- Amir Arsalān e Nāmdār ("Amir Arsalan the Famous"), a popular legend that was narrated to Naser-ed-Din Shah.
- Dārāb-nāme ("Book of Darab"), a 12th-century book by Abu Taher Tarsusi that recounts a fiction about Alexander the Great and Darius III.
- Eskandar-nāme, also known as "The Persian Alexander Romances", an Iranianized version of The Romance of Alexander. Not to be confused with the classic book of Nezami.
- One Thousand and One Nights, the frame-story of which derives from the now lost Middle Persian work Hazār Afsān ("Thousand Nights").
- Samak-e Ayyār, a folktale about an Iranian ayyār that was written down during the 12th century. Ayyār, at times synonymous with javānmard ("young man"), referred to a member of a class of warriors in Iran from the 9th to the 12th century.
- Šāhnāme ("Book of Kings"), the national epic of Iran, written by 10th-century Persian poet Ferdowsi, based on Xwadāynāmag, a Middle Persian compilation of the history of Iranian kings and heroes from mythical times down to the reign of Chosroes II.
- Vāmeq o Ozrā, a derivation from the Greek romance of Metiochus and Parthenope that was written down by Persian poet Onsori in the 11th century.

=== Heroes ===
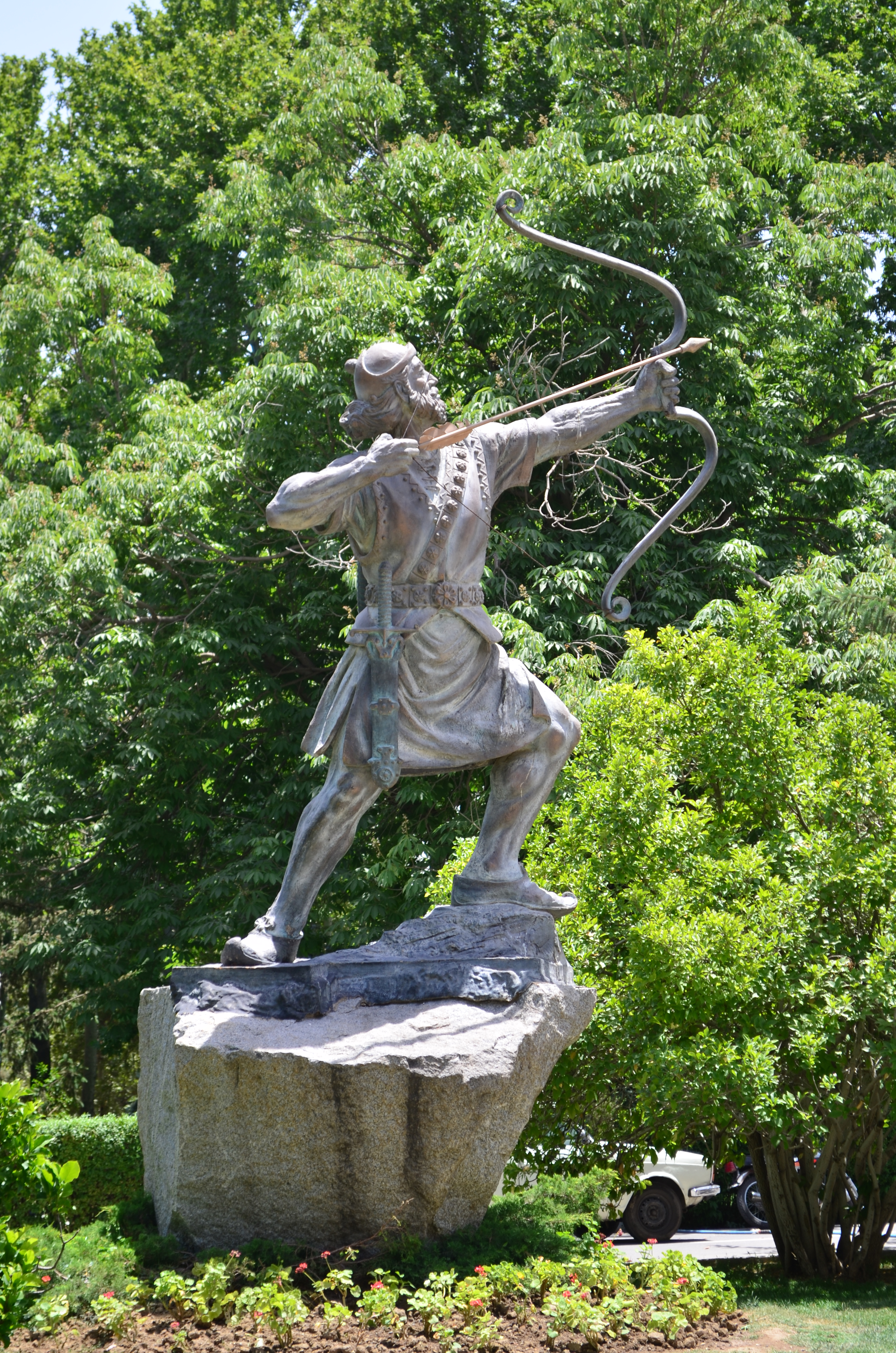
The statue of Arash the Archer at Saadabad, Tehran

==== Heroes in Šāhnāme ====
- Arash the Archer (Āraš-e Kamāngir), who shot his arrow from the peak of Damavand to settle a land dispute between Iran and Turan. The festival of Tirgan is linked to this epic, besides having roots in the ancient myth of archangel Tishtrya.
- Garshasp (Garšāsp), a dragon-slaying hero in Iranian legends, now honored as jahān-pahlavān ("chief hero").
- Gordafarid (Gordāfarid), praised for her daringly martial role in the tragedy of Rostam o Sohrāb ("Rostam and Sohrab").
- Kaveh the Blacksmith
- Rostam, a celebrated marzbān ("border-guardian"), best known for his mournful battle with his son Sohrab. He was the son of Dastan.
- Zahhak

==== Other heroes ====
- Hossein the Kurd of Shabestar (Hoseyn Kord-e Šabestari), a Kurdish warrior from Shabestar who devoted his life to fighting for justice, representing a javānmard ("young man").
- Koroghlu, a legendary hero who seeks to fight against the unjust, in the oral traditions of the Turkic-speaking peoples.
- Pourya-ye Vali, a 14th-century champion from Khwarezm, regarded as a role model by zurkhane athletes.
- Yaʿqub-e Leys, under the court of whom the Persian language reemerged after two centuries of eclipse by Arabic ("Two Centuries of Silence").

=== Characters in jokes ===
- Molla Nasreddin
- Dakho

=== Creatures ===
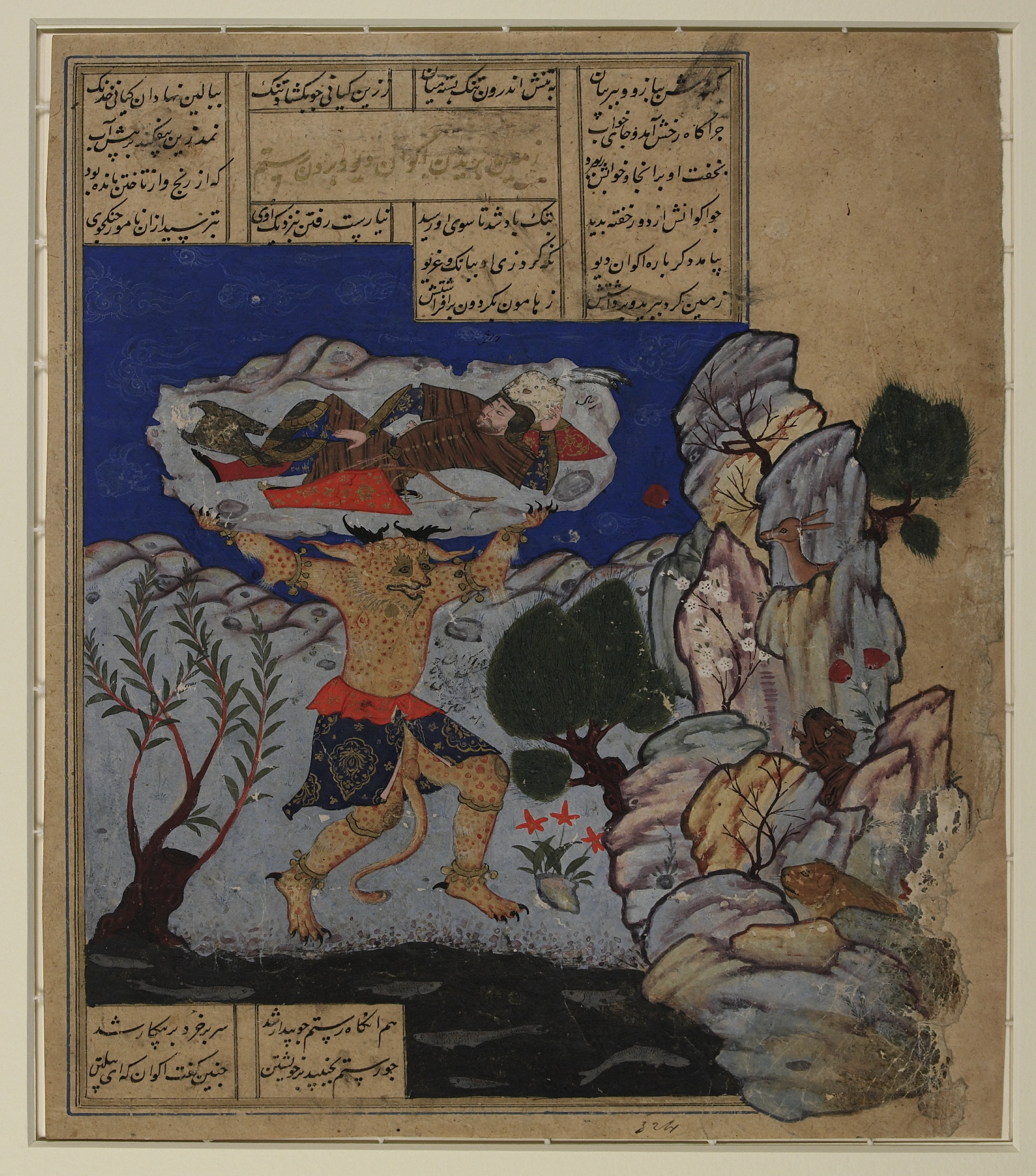
A Šāhnāme miniature painting, depicting a demon (div) throwing Rostam into the sea

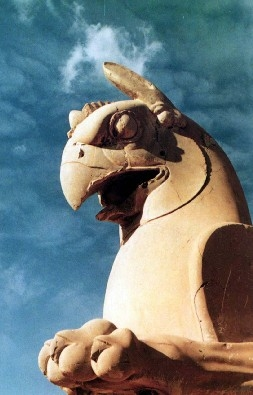
Griffin-like column capital statuary, from about 500 BC Persepolis, Iran. In local popular interpretation, the figures on these columns are perceived as representations of the Huma bird.

- Āl: a scrawny old woman with a clay nose and red face who attacks pregnant women when they are alone and interferes with childbirth. It is believed that she carries a basket in which she puts the liver or lung of the mother, although a variety of other descriptions exist as well.
- Night hag (baxtak): a ghost or an evil creature that causes sleep paralysis. It is believed that the creature knows about hidden treasures, and one would be told of one of them by grabbing the creature's nose. One can rescue oneself from the creature by wiggling one’s fingers.
- Himantopodes (davālpā): an evil creature that uses its flexible, leather-like legs as tentacles to grip and capture human beings. The captives will be enslaved and forced to carry the creature until they die of fatigue.
- Huma: a Griffin-like mythical bird said to never come to rest, living its entire life flying invisibly high above the earth, and never alighting on the ground (in some legends it is said to have no legs)
- Demon (div; from Avestan daēva): an evil being, devil, ogre, or giant.
- Ghoul (ğul): a hideous monster with a feline head, forked tongue, hairy skin, and deformed legs that resemble the limp and skinny legs of a prematurely born infant.
- Genie (jenn): a supernatural creature, comparable to the elves and the goblins, that is believed to have been created from smokeless fire and to exist invisibly alongside the visible world.
- Manticore (mardxâr: from Middle Persian martyaxwar), a man-eater with the head of a human and the body of a lion, similar to the Egyptian sphinx.
- Amen Bird (morğ-e āmin): a mythical bird in Persian literature that flies continuously and fulfills people's wishes.
- Pari: a type of exquisite, winged fairy-like spirit ranking between angels and evil spirits.
- Reera, Rayra or Raira: was a beautiful supernatural female who was believed to have brought beauty to the Northern jungles of Iran.
- The Patient Stone (sang-e sabur): the most empathetic of listeners, which is believed to absorb the sorrows and pains of the person who confides in it. It is said that when the stone can no longer contain the pain it harbors, it bursts into pieces. It is also a very famous folktale.
- Šāh-mārān ("Chief of the Snakes"): the intelligent queen of snakes who has human features above her waist and those of a serpent below.
- Shahrokh
- Simorğ (from Middle Persian Sēnmurw, Avestan mərəγō saēnō; "raptor"): a benevolent mythical bird.
- Takam: the king of goats, in the folklore of the Turkic-speaking people of Azerbaijan. Traditionally, the stories of takam are recited in public theaters by a minstrel called takamchi.
- Zār: an evil spirit in the folklore of Iran's southern coastal regions who possesses individuals and harms them.

=== Locations ===
- Mount Damavand
- Mount Qaf
- Paristan

== Social beliefs and practices ==
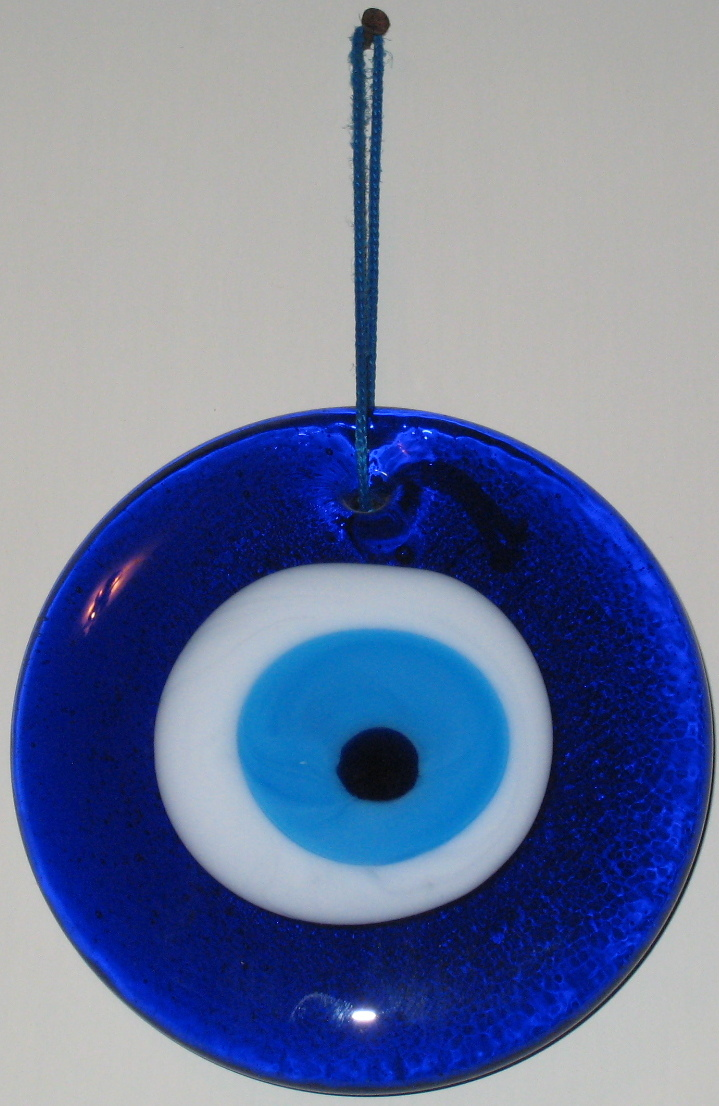
A stone depicting an eye that is made to protect one from an evil eye

- Evil eye (češm-zaxm; Middle Persian: duščašm), a curse believed to be cast by a malevolent glare. To protect one from it, a pendant, gemstone or likewise that depicts an eye is used as an amulet. Another way believed to protect one from an evil eye is to release a fragrant smoke of esfand (peganum harmala) and waft it around the head of those exposed to the gaze of strangers. As this is done, an ancient prayer is also recited.
- Divination (morvā, šogun, fāl), including interpretation of objects which appear haphazardly, interpretation of involuntary bodily actions (sneezing, twitching, itches, etc.), observing animal behavior, playing cards or chick-peas, bibliomancy (e.g., using the poetry of Hafez Shirazi), mirrors and lenses, observation of the liver of a slain animal, the flame of a lamp, etc.
- Nāz o niyāz ("coquetry and supplication"), a tradition between a lover and a beloved based on which the beloved hurts their lover by coquetry and the lover's response is supplication and insistence in love.
- Taārof, a sort of etiquette, defined as "the active, ritualized realization of differential status in interaction".
- In Iranian wedding tradition, it is customary to buy a silver mirror and two candles and place it on the wedding sofra (a piece of cloth), next to foods and other traditional items. The first thing that the bridegroom sees in the mirror should be the reflection of his wife-to-be.

== Ceremonies ==
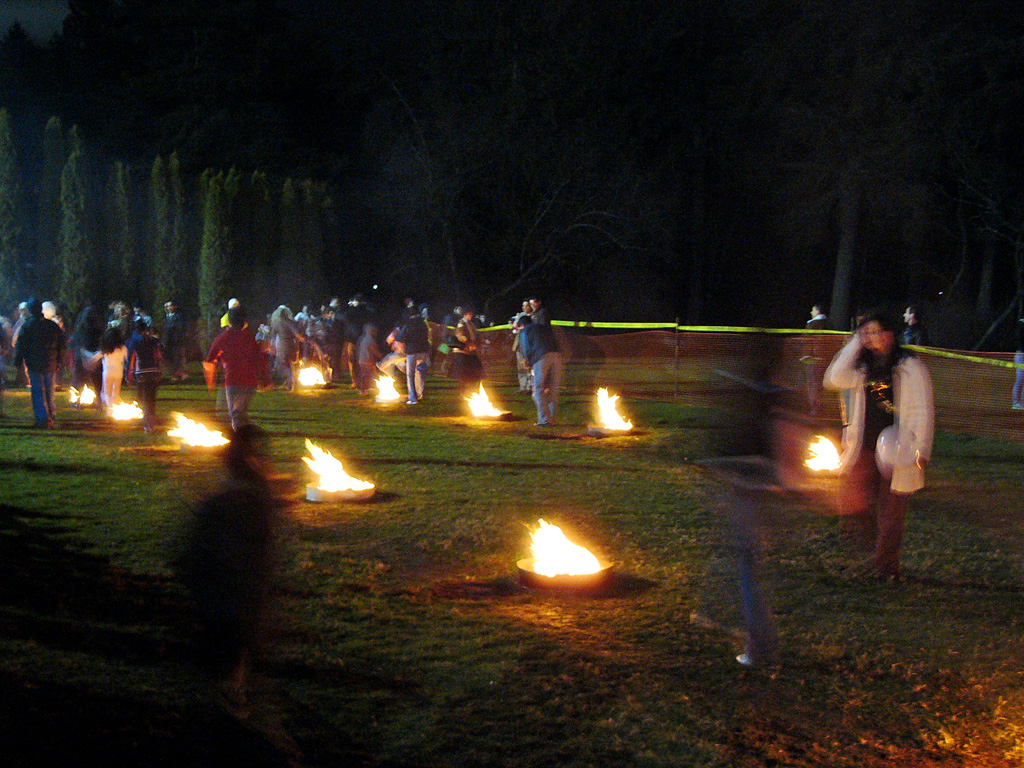
Jumping over bonfires on the occasion of Čāršanbe Suri

- Nowruz ("new day"), the Iranian New Year's day, celebrated on the vernal equinox.
  - Traditional heralds: Amu Nowruz and Haji Firuz
  - Čāršanbe Suri ("Red Wednesday"), celebrated on the eve of the last Wednesday before Nowruz by performing rituals such as jumping over bonfires and lighting off firecrackers and fireworks.
    - Problem-solving nuts (ājil-e moškel-gošā)
    - Fālguš, an act of fortune-telling on the occasion of Čāršanbe Suri.
  - Sizdebedar, celebrated 13 days after Nowruz (Farvardin 13, usually coincided with April 1 or 2) by picnicking.
  - Mir-e Nowruzi ("prince of Nowruz") or Padešāh-e Nowruz ("king of Nowruz"), a festival that used to be held six days after Nowruz for a period of one to five days, during which a temporary commoner was elected to rule over the country.
- Yaldā, marking "the longest night of the year" and commemorating the birth of the ancient goddess Mithra on the eve of the winter solstice (čelle-ye zemestān; usually falling on December 20 or 21).

== Folk-games ==
- Alak-dolak ("peg [and] bat"), identical to tip-cat.
- Amu zanjirbāf ("uncle chain-maker")
- Atal matal tutule, a counting-out game, used as a children's nursery rhyme.
- Āftāb-mahtāb ("sunshine-moonlight")
- Ās-nās, a card game that is identical to poker.
- Tag (bālā-bolandi, gorgam-be-havā)
- Ganjafe, a trick-taking card game.
- Court piece (hokm), a trick-taking card game that is identical to whist.
- Hopscotch (ley-ley)
- Backgammon (nard), a two-player board game.
- Pāsur, a fishing card game.
- Knucklebones (qāp-bazi)
- Hide-and-seek (qāyem-mušak)
- Šelem, a trick-taking card game that is identical to rook.
- Ye-qol-do-qol
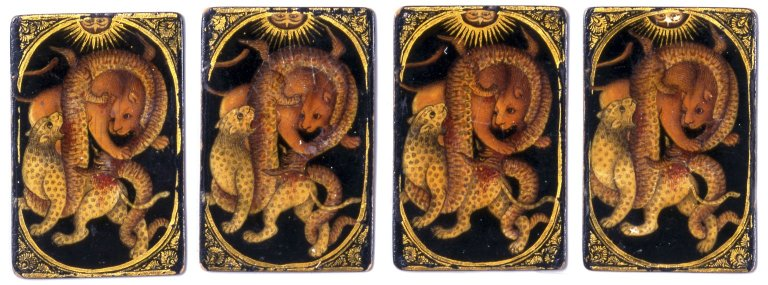
Ās-nās cards. Brooklyn Museum, New York City.

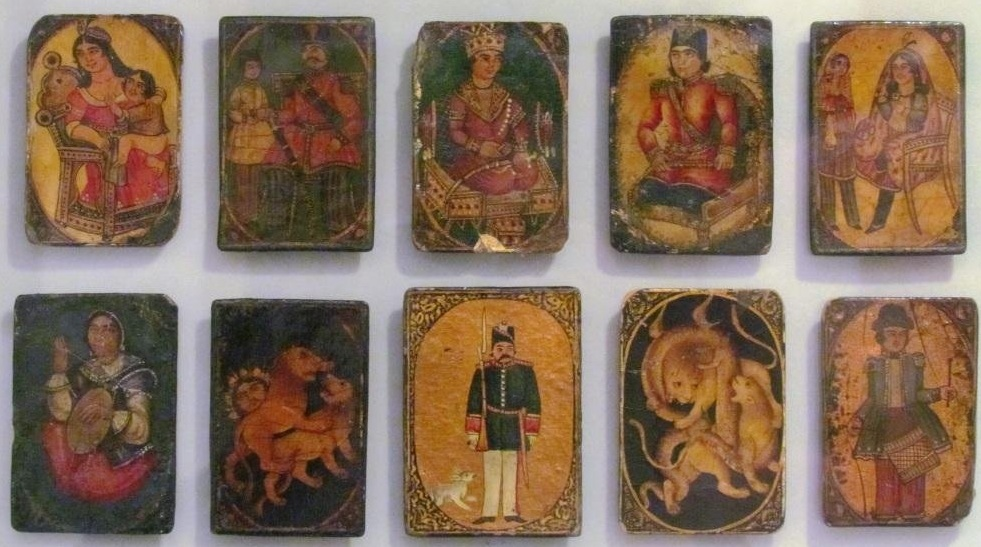
Ganjafe cards. Moghadam Museum, Tehran.

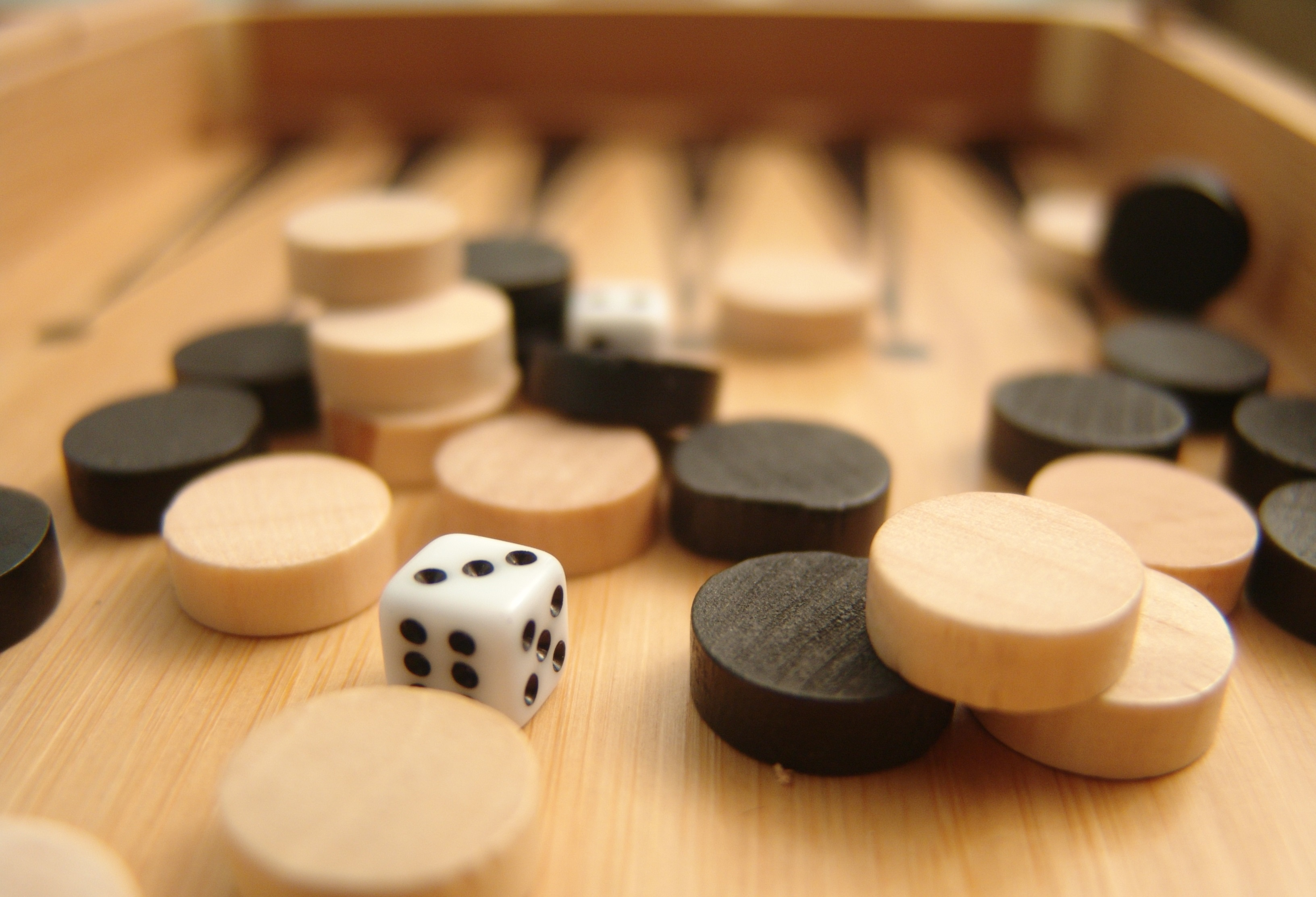
Backgammon (nard) dice and beads

== See also ==
- Iranian folk music
- Persian dance
- Persian theatre

Iranian folktales:

- The Black Colt
- Grünkappe
- Leaves of Pearls
- Molla Badji
- The Horse of the Cloud and the Wind
- The Snake-Prince Sleepy-Head
- The Wonderful Sea-Horse
- Yasmin and the Serpent Prince
- The Orange and Citron Princess
