= Takam doll =

Iranian folk art tradition

Takam dolls and Takamchees are heralds of Nowrouz and a part of Iranian folk art tradition. Takam is a Turkish word meaning “male goat". It is a strong goat that moves at the head of the herd. The goat is a symbol of blessing, fertility, and power in Iran. The Takam doll is made from wood, clothes, shoelaces, and pullak in the shape of a goat. It is usually worn with a red velvet covering. Takamchees and children sing songs reflecting the past while carrying the doll. The song lyrics are mostly about Nowrouz and religion. The lyrics are:

Here comes the spring, here it comes,
Daisy and flowers of all kinds are coming here,
His Excellency Gabriel gave the prophet the letter,
Upon this, prophet made a prayer and Nowrouz was blessed,
Be blessed and fruitful, your days, weeks, months, and years.
