= Saya (poem) =

Sāyā (Persian: سایا) is the type of poem or song that a Takam-Chi chants while playing a Takam.
