= The Horse of the Cloud and the Wind =

Iranian folk tale

The Horse of the Cloud and the Wind (Persian: اسب ابر و باد) is an Iranian folktale first published by Iranian scholar Mohsen Mihan-Dust. It is classified in the international Aarne-Thompson-Uther Index as ATU 314, "Goldener". It deals with a friendship between a king's son and a magic horse that comes from the sea; both are later forced to flee for their lives due to the boy's stepmother, and reach another kingdom, where the boy adopts another identity.

Although it differs from variants wherein a hero acquires golden hair, its starting sequence (persecution by the hero's stepmother) is considered by scholarship as an alternate opening to the same tale type.

== Sources ==
According to German professor Ulrich Marzolph, the tale was sourced from Khorasan.

== Summary ==
In a land, a king rules over the divs, and has a son. He also has a wonderful horse (called "رخش" in the original text) that goes to foal somewhere out of sight. The div prince ("Diovzadeh") goes to investigate and follows the mare to a well. As soon as the animal is ready to release its young into the well, the prince rescues the colt and takes it with him back home to raise. Meanwhile, the wife of the div king dies and he remarries. One time, when the king is away, the new queen plots with the prayer writer how to kill the prince. They conspire to place some snakes in a jug of water and give the prince very salty food, which would cause him to feel thirsty and drink from the jug. leading to the snakes biting and killing him. The horse warns the div prince about the trap and the youth dunks the water in another vessel to avoid the snakes.

The next time, the queen finds another accomplice, who advises her to dig up a well, fill it with blades and spears, then covers it with a rug for the prince to sit on and fall to his death. Again, the horse warns the prince about. Failing both times, the queen consults with her accomplice, who advises her to feign illness by smearing her face with turmeric, place some breakable bread under her body to pretend it is the sound of her bones breaking, and ask for the flesh of the horse as remedy. The next day, the div prince goes to talk with his horse, and the animal says the queen wants to kill it, and the prince's mullah is in on the plan. The horse will neigh three times, after the third neigh they will kill him.

The prince goes to school, when the hears the horse's three whinnies. He hits the mullah, who wanted to retain at school, and rushes to aid his horse. He reaches his father's courtyard and asks for a ride on the horse before it is killed, but with his stepmother as his company. The div king allows it, and the prince climbs on the horse, the queen after him. Suddenly, the horse begins to soar, and lets the queen fall from its back to her death, while the equine takes the div prince to another country. When the horse lands, the div prince buys a sheep from a nearby shepherd, kills it and wears it skin on his head. The horse gives some of the hairs of its wings to the prince and tells him he has but to burn the hairs and the animal will come at once, then departs.

The div prince, in his new disguise, wanders off until he reaches the garden of a nearby king, and spies on the three princesses frolicking in the garden, falling in love with the youngest of them. He summons his horse and asks it to provide him with clothes and appearance "of a human" ("زمینی‌ها", in the original). It happens thus, and the div prince is seen by the human princess, who falls in love with him. The following week, the local king gives three apples to his daughters for them to choose their husbands by throwing it: the elder sister throws her to the son of the right hand minister, the middle one to the son of the minister of the left hand, and the youngest to the div prince, in his lowly disguise. The king dislikes his cadette's choice and organizes a humble wedding for her.

Some time later, the king orders his sons-in-law to go hunting, giving fine stallions to the first two sons-in-law and a lame mount to the lowly one. After his brothers-in-law depart, the div prince summons his horse and both depart to the wilderness to hunt. The two brothers-in-law cannot find any good game, until they spot the prince on the horse, whom they do not recognize. The duo ask for some of the stranger's game, which he agrees to lend, in exchange for branding them. A deal is made, and the brothers-in-law bring some game home for the princesses to cook for the king. The dishes prepared by the elder princesses are tasteless, while the youngest's is delicious.

The next morning, a servant reports to the king a palace materialized near the royal palace, more beautiful than the king's. Its occupant, who is the div prince under another disguise appears and says he is looking for his two runaway slaves, branded with his seal. The king orders a search through the whole kingdom for the slaves, and orders for everyone to show their bodies. Finally, it is time for the king's two sons-in-law, who have the brands on their bodies. The king, disappointed in them, strips them of their inheritance. The div prince resumes his true form with the help of the horse, gives his jewels to his father-in-law and inherits the kingdom.

== Analysis ==
=== Tale type ===
The tale is classified in the Aarne-Thompson-Uther Index as type ATU 314, "The Goldener": a youth with golden hair works as the king's gardener. The type may also open with the prince for some reason being the servant of an evil being, where he gains the same gifts, and the tale proceeds as in this variant. In this case, it is an "independent Near Eastern subtype of AT 314".

Professor Ulrich Marzolph, in his catalogue of Persian folktales, named type 314 in Iranian sources as Das Zauberfohlen ("The Magic Horse"): the horse saves the protagonist from jealous relatives and takes him to another kingdom; in this kingdom, the protagonist is advised by the horse to dress in shabby garments (as a "Kačal") and work as the king's gardener; a princess falls in love with him. Marzolph listed 17 variants of this type across Persian sources. In addition, according to Marzolph, the tale type, also known as Korre-ye daryā'i (German: Das Meeresfohlen; English: "The Sea Foal"), is one of the most collected types in the archives of Markaz-e farhang-e mardom (Centre of Popular Culture), and a well-known Iranian folktale.

==== Introductory episodes ====
Scholarship notes three different opening episodes to the tale type: (1) the hero becomes a magician's servant and is forbidden to open a certain door, but he does and dips his hair in a pool of gold; (2) the hero is persecuted by his stepmother, but his loyal horse warns him and later they both flee; (3) the hero is given to the magician as payment for the magician's help with his parents' infertility problem. Folklorist Christine Goldberg, in Enzyklopädie des Märchens, related the second opening to former tale type AaTh 532, "The Helpful Horse (I Don't Know)", wherein the hero is persecuted by his stepmother and flees from home with his horse. (Note: According to Stith Thompson's 1961 revision of the index, in type 532 the hero's helpful horse advises him to answer every question with the sentence "I don't know".)

American folklorist Barre Toelken recognized the spread of the tale type across Northern, Eastern and Southern Europe, but identified three subtypes: one that appears in Europe (Subtype 1), wherein the protagonist becomes the servant to a magical person, finds the talking horse and discovers his benefactor's true evil nature, and acquires a golden colour on some part of his body; a second narrative (Subtype 3), found in Greece, Turkey, Caucasus, Uzbekistan and Northern India, where the protagonist is born through the use of a magical fruit; and a third one (Subtype 2). According to Toelken, this Subtype 2 is "the oldest", being found "in Southern Siberia, Iran, the Arabian countries, Mediterranean, Hungary and Poland". In this subtype, the hero (who may be a prince) and the foal are born at the same time and become friends, but their lives are at stake when the hero's mother asks for the horse's vital organ (or tries to kill the boy to hide her affair), which motivates their flight from their homeland to another kingdom.

=== Motifs ===
Professor Anna Birgitta Rooth stated that the motif of the stepmother's persecution of the hero appears in tale type 314 in variants from Slavonic, Eastern European and Near Eastern regions. She also connected this motif to part of the Cinderella cycle, in a variation involving a male hero and his cow.

==== The suitor selection test ====
In Iranian tales about the sea-horse, the princess throws an apple to her suitor - a motif indexed as motif H316, "Suitor test: apple thrown indicates princess' choice (often golden apple)". According to mythologist Yuri Berezkin and other Russian researchers, the motif is "popular" in Iran, and is also attested "in Central Europe, the Balkans, the Caucasus, the Near East, and Central Asia". In the same vein, professor Mahomed-Nuri Osmanovich Osmanov noted that the motif of the princess throwing an item to choose her husband is "widespread" ("распространение", in the original) in tales from the Iranian peoples.

According to Turkologist Karl Reichl, types ATU 314 and ATU 502 contain this motif: the princess chooses her own husband (of lowly appearance) in a gathering of potential suitors, by giving him an object (e.g., an apple). However, he also remarks that the motif is "spread in folk literature" and may appear in other tale types.

Germanist Günter Dammann, in Enzyklopädie des Märchens, argued that Subtype 2 (see above) represented the oldest form of the Goldener narrative, since the golden apple motif in the suitor selection roughly appears in the geographic distribution of the same subtype.

===== Literary parallels =====
Some scholars have compared the motif to marriage rites and customs attested in ancient literature. For example, Günter Dammann, in Enzyklopädie des Märchens, compared the motif to the Indian ritual of svayamvara, and reported evidence of a similar practice in Ancient Iran.

French folklorist Emmanuel Cosquin noted that the suitor selection test was component of a larger narrative: the princess or bride-to-be chooses the hero, in lowly disguise, by throwing him an apple. According to him, this motif would be comparable to the ancient Indian ritual of svayamvara, wherein the bride, in a public gathering, would choose a husband by giving him a garland of flowers. In addition, Swedish scholar Waldemar Liungman (1948), who argued for its remote antiquity, saw in the golden apple motif a mark of the princess's self-choice of husband, and traced a parallel between it and a narrative cited by Aristotle regarding the founding of Massalia (modern day Marseille).

Similarly, in an ancient treatise written by historian Mirkhond, translated by linguist David Shea, it is reported that prince Gushtasp went to the land of "Room" during a suitor selection test held by princess Kitabun: as it was custom, a maiden of marriageable age was to walk through an assemblage of noble men with an orange and throw it to her husband-to-be. Gushtasp attends the event and the princess throws her orange to him, indicating her choice.

In regards to a similar tale from the Dungan people, according to Sinologist Boris L. Riftin, the motif of a princess (or woman of high social standing) throwing a silken ball atop a high tower to choose her husband is reported in the ancient Chinese story of "Lu Meng-Zheng": the princess throws a silken ball to a passing youth named Meng-Zheng (a poor student), and the king expels his daughter to live with her husband in a cave. In addition, some scholars (e.g., Ting Nai-tung, Wolfram Eberhard, Phra Indra Montri (Francis Giles)) remarked that a similar wedding folk custom (a maiden throwing a ball from a balcony to her husband of choice) was practiced among some Chinese minorities and in South China. The motif is also reported in ancient Chinese literature.

==== The gardener hero ====
Swedish scholar Waldemar Liungman drew attention to a possible ancient parallel to the gardener hero of the tale type: in an account of the story of king Sargon of Akkad, he, in his youth, works as a gardener in a palace and attracts the attention of goddess Ishtar. According to scholars Wolfram Eberhard and Pertev Naili Boratav, this would mean that the motif is "very old" ("sehr alt") in the Near East.

According to Richard MacGillivray Dawkins, in the tale type, the hero as gardener destroys and restores the garden after he finds work, and, later, fights in the war. During the battle, he is injured, and the king dresses his wound with a kerchief, which will serve as token of recognition.

==== The helpful horse ====
According to scholars James R. Russell and Wheeler Thackston, the bahri, merhorse or sea-stallion appears in the folklore of Iranian peoples. (Note: However, the sea-born horse also appears in the folklore of Turkic peoples, either itself coming from a water body or being the result of a mating between a sea-stallion and a terrestrial mare.) On its own, the merhorse is a fantastical equine imbued with human speech, the ability to fly and other magical powers, and acts as the hero's helper. In addition, according to Gudrun Schubert and Renate Würsch, the horse may be known as Asp-i-baḥrī ('Meerpferd'), that is, an equine that lives in the sea or other water bodies. The merhorse or its foal also appear in epic tradition as the hero's mount. (Note: Although, according to researcher Elizabeth Lambourn and Indologist Wendy Doniger, the word bahri, 'from or of the sea' (in Lambourn) or 'seaborne' (in Doniger), refers to the importation of Arabian and Persian horses via maritime trade to South Asia, during the Sultanate period.)

==== Quest for the remedy ====
A motif that appears in tale type 314 is the hero having to find a cure for the ailing king, often the milk of a certain animal (e.g., a lioness). According to scholar Erika Taube, this motif occurs in tales from North Africa to East Asia, even among Persian- and Arabic-speaking peoples. Similarly, Hasan M. El-Shamy noted that the quest for the king's remedy appears as a subsidiary event "in the Arab-Berber culture area". In addition, Germanist Gunter Dammann, in Enzyklopädie des Märchens, noted that the motif of the quest for the remedy appeared "with relative frequency" in over half of the variants that start with the Subtype 2 opening (stepmother's persecution of hero and horse).

==== Branding the brothers-in-law ====
According to German scholars Günther Damman and Kurt Ranke, another motif that appears in tale type ATU 314 is the hero branding his brothers-in-law during their hunt. Likewise, Ranke stated that the hero's branding represented a mark of his ownership over his brothers-in-law.

Ranke located the motif in the Orient and in the Mediterranean. Similarly, according to Arthur Christensen, marking the brothers-in-law is "common" in the Oriental versions. In the same vein, Hungarian professor Ákos Dömötör, in the notes to tale type ATU 314 in the Hungarian National Catalogue of Folktales (MNK), remarked that the motif was a "reflection of the Eastern legal custom", which also appears in the Turkic epic Alpamysh.

== Variants ==
According to Germanist Gunter Dammann, tale type 314 with the opening of hero and horse fleeing home extends from Western Himalaya and South Siberia, to Iran and the Arab-speaking countries in the Eastern Mediterranean. In addition, scholar Hasan El-Shamy stated that type 314 is "widely spread throughout north Africa", among Arabs and Berbers; in sub-Saharan Africa, as well as in Arabia and South Arabia.

=== Iran ===
==== The Black Foal (Azarshab) ====
In a tale collected from the Kohgiluyeh and Boyer-Ahmad with the title "کرّهٔ سیاه" ('Black Foal'), a king has a black mare in his herd that foals on the rim of a well. The king's son, prince Muhammad, wants to have a fine foal and rescues the mare's the next time it foals. He raises the foal and becomes its friend. Meanwhile, the queen, the prince's stepmother, tries to seduce her stepson, but he refuses her advances. Spurned, she tries to kill him by poisoning his food, but the foal warns Muhammad not to eat anything. She attempts on his life many times, but is always foiled by the foal. Thus, she consults with an old sorceress how to destroy the horse, and the sorceress gives her a seven-headed snake for her to throw it in the stables so it devours the prince and his horse. That same night, the snake slithers to the stables to attack on the sleeping pair, but the foal wakes up and trots down the reptile. Failing all that, the sorceress convinces the queen to feign illness, and she will advise from a hiding place that she needs the meat of the black foal as remedy. The king finds the queen in a pained state and the sorceress, from a hiding place, shouts that she needs the meat. Thinking the message came from a supernatural source, he decides to sacrifice his son's foal, and orders Muhammad's teacher to hold him at school. Meanwhile, the black foal warns the prince of the planned execution, and says it will neigh three times to alert him.

The next day, Muhammad is being held at school, when he hears the foal's neigh, throws some ashes and salt on his teacher's face, and rushes back home. When he arrives, he asks his father to ride with the foal with his mother's saddle around his mother's grave seven times. The king allows his request, but the foal, after the ride, jumps over the king's head and rides away to another kingdom. Away from home, prince Muhammad kills a deer and skins it, then the foal gives some of its hair to him and tells him to find work nearby. Muhammad hires himself with the local king. One day, the king's seven daughters wish to marry, and ask Muhammad to give seven melons to their father as analogy of their marriageability. The king receives the fruits and, correctly interpreting their message, summons an assemblage of eligible suitors for the princesses to choose from by throwing an orange to their suitors of choice. The youngest princess throws her orange to Muhammad, who was just passing by the crowd at the time, marking her choice. The king, however, becomes so sad and his eyes become blind.

The royal doctors prescribe deer meat as cure for him, and the king's sons-in-law ride to the wilderness to begin their hunt. Muhammad hunts better than his brothers-in-law, so much so they ask him for some game. The prince agrees, as long as they agree to be his slaves. They make a deal and Muhammad brands their backs, but he also curses the carcasses for their taste to fix on the heads, not on the bodies. The king then eats the dishes prepares with the deer meat and does not recover, only when he eats the dish prepared with the deer's head. After that, war breaks out, and the seven sons-in-law ride into battle. Muhammad summons the black foal and joins the battle, killing his father-in-law's enemies. The princesses each proclaim the mysterious knight is their husband. Muhammad then builds a tent and the king sends his sons-in-law to discover his identity, but Muhammad detains each of them. The king himself goes to meet the mysterious knight, and recognizes him as Muhammad.

=== Asia ===
==== South Asia ====
===== Punjab =====
Anglo-British academic Lucas White King collected a tale during his stay in Dera Ghazi Khan District and published it as a Punjabi tale. In this story, titled The Prince and the Spirit Horse, a sultan remarries. His second wife tries to seduce her step-son, but he rejects her advances. Feeling dejected, she feigns illness and asks for the prince's horse as a cure. The story then flashbacks to the time when the prince got his horse: the sultan had a mare in the stables that foaled next to a well; the prince followed her and asked for a foal to be given to him. Back to the present, the sultan decides to sacrifice it to appease his new wife, but the prince asks for one last ride on the horse. He seizes the opportunity to gallop away from his father's kingdom and reach a distant city, where he passes by the king's balcony and the youngest princess falls in love with him at first sight. Later, the prince dismisses the horse and finds work as a cowherd. The city's king learns of his youngest's infatuation with the cowherd, marries her to him and gives her a poor house fit for a cowherd's living. Later, the prince joins his six brothers-in-law for a hunt: while the other men have no luck in getting good game, the prince summons his horse, dons fine garments and hunts much sport. The six brothers-in-law meet the prince, but do not recognize him, and ask for a share of his game; the prince agrees to give them some, in exchange for him branding their backs. Next, a neighbouring sultan prepares to invade the city, and the king's seven sons-in-law are summoned to fight him. The prince takes off the cowherd disguise, summons his horse and joins the fray to turn the tide of battle in favour of his father-in-law. The battle over, he returns to his lowly position, while the other six princes take the credit for the victory. The cowherd's wife, the seventh princess, visits her sisters and they boast about their husbands' prowess in battle. The princess cries to her husband, who decides to reveal himself to his father-in-law. To prove his claims, the prince tells about the branded backs of the other princes. The tale has been considered a "parallel" to Iranian "The Colt Qeytas".

In a tale translated to German with the title Der Prinz und sein Zauberpferd ("The Prince and his Magic Horse"), a sultan loses his wife and remarries. The new queen begins to lust after her stepson, but he refuses her advances. Spurned by the prince, she feigns illness which the royal doctors cannot cure, and says only the blood of the prince's pet horse can cure her. The tale then flashbacks to the time where the prince found his equine friend: a mare from the stables disappeared, and the prince followed her one day; he found it near the rim of a well ready to foal; the equine revealed its foals were of a special breed, which it dumped in the well each time; the prince then requested to have the mare's latest colt to groom and raise. It happened thus, and the colt becomes a fine stallion. Back to the present, the sultan informs the prince they must sacrifice the horse for the queen's sake, to the prince's grief. The prince asks his father to be allowed one last ride on the horse. The king allows it, and the prince escapes with the horse in a quick motion over a wild river, and reaches another land, despite his father's soldier trying to stop him. The horse says it is a djinn, and assures it will help the prince, but he has to let it graze with its brethren. The prince agrees and they make their way to a city, passing by the princess's balcony, then reaching a humble house where he takes shelter and finds work as a cowherd. The local king learns his youngest daughter has fallen in love with the stranger, and orders him to be brought to his presence: the lowly cowherd. The king marries his daughter off and places her with her husband in his humble hut. One day, the king sends his six sons-in-law on a hunt. The six brothers-in-law cannot find any game, and chance by a prince (who is their brother-in-law, whom they do not recognize) on a horse who has several wild animals beside him. The men ask for some, and the prince agrees to a deal: some of the game in exchange for branding their backs. The brothers-in-law agree, and the prince rushes back to his lowly hut in time to put on the cowherd disguise and lament to his father-in-law he could not join the others in the hunt, while the other princesses' husbands gloat about their "success". Later, war breaks out with an enemy king, and the monarch sends his seven sons-in-law to the battlefront. The seventh, the prince, doffs his cowherd disguise and waits on his horse for the right moment to enter the battle, then rides into battle, commands his father-in-law's soldiers and wins the war. The six sons-in-law return home victorious and boast about their victory, but one of them does mention the knight at the battlefield. The king then admonishes and mocks his cowherd son-in-law for not doing anything to help. The next morning, the youngest princess goes to her father's castle, is mocked by her elder sisters, and goes back crying to her husband. The prince consoles her and tells her the whole story, then puts on his princely clothes and rides to his father-in-law's palace, where the whole court is gathered. He presents himself in his true identity to his father-in-law, telling him the whole story and indicating as proof of his claims the brands on his brothers-in-law's bodies. The king sees the brands on the sons-in-law's backs, who can only remain silent in their shame, then gifts his youngest daughter and her husband a large palace and names him his heir. The tale was originally collected by Aziza Bagum in 1973, in Rasulnagar, Pakistani Punjab, from an informant named Khawaja Saddique, a 50-year-old merchant.

== See also ==
- The Black Colt
- The Wonderful Sea-Horse
