= The Wonderful Sea-Horse =

Iranian folktale about a prince and a horse from the sea

Folk tale
- Name: The Wonderful Sea-Horse
- Aarne–Thompson grouping: ATU 314, "Goldener"
- Region: Iran
- Published in: The Wonderful Sea-horse: And Other Persian Tales by Laurence Paul Elwell-Sutton (1950)
- Related: The Black Colt; The Horse of the Cloud and the Wind; The Magician's Horse; Little Johnny Sheep-Dung; The Gifts of the Magician; Făt-Frumos with the Golden Hair; Donotknow; The Story of the Prince and His Horse; The Tale of Clever Hasan and the Talking Horse; Adventures of a Boy

The Wonderful Sea-Horse is an Iranian folktale collected from storyteller Mashdi Galeen Khanom and published by Laurence Paul Elwell-Sutton. It is classified in the international Aarne-Thompson-Uther Index as ATU 314, "Goldener". It deals with a friendship between a king's son and a magic horse that comes from the sea; both are later forced to flee for their lives due to the boy's own sisters, and reach another kingdom, where the boy adopts another identity.

Although it differs from variants wherein a hero acquires golden hair, its starting sequence (persecution by the hero's female relative, e.g., his sisters) is considered by scholarship as an alternate opening to the same tale type.

== Origin ==
The tale was provided by a female storyteller from Iran named Mashdī Galīn Khānom, and published by L. P. Elwell-Sutton. German scholar Ulrich Marzolph, in his catalogue of Persian folktales, sourced the story from Markazi province.

== Summary ==
A king has many daughters, but only one son, Prince Ebrahim, whom he dotes on, to the girls' jealousy. One day, some huntsmen bring to the palace a horse they have captured, which the prince wants to himself. The king buys him the horse and takes it to the stalls, feeding it sweets and comfits instead of hay or barley. Years later, when the boy is 13 years old, the princesses, his sisters, begin to hate him, and decide to kill him: first, they hire well-diggers to dig up a hole in his room, place knives, spikes and swords inside it, and cover it with carpets. One day, Prince Ebrahim goes home from school and goes to meet the horse, finding it weeping for him, since the princesses are trying to kill him and prepared a trap in his room. With the horse's warning, he jumps over the trap, uncovers the carpet and goes to tell his father. The king then investigates into the matter, and traces the order to the princesses, although they deny any involvement.

Next, the girls bribe the cook to poison their brother's food. However, Ebrahim is again warned of the danger by his sea-horse: he feeds the cat with it and it dies. The king once again traces the assassination attempt to his daughters, and still they deny it. The princesses notice that their plans failed and discover the reason: a stableboy tells them the sea-horse is helping their brother. Thus, Fatima, the youngest princess, whom the king loves most of all the princesses, feigns illness and ask for the sea-horse's blood as cure. The king is torn at the decision, but his viziers advise him to let the teacher keep him at school while they sacrifice the horse.

Prince Ebrahim goes to meet the sea-horse again in the evening, and is told of the course of action they plan to take. The sea-horse worries for the boy, and conspires with the prince how they can escape: the prince is to pocket some jewels and his finest garments, then pocket some ashes to throw at his teacher and some pennies at the students to distract them, while the sea-horse will neigh three times to alert the prince; when he rushes back to the palace, he is to ask for a last ride on the animal, three times around the yard. The next morning, it happens thus: the prince rides around three times, each time confessing to his father about the attempts on his life, and flies away on the horse to another realm.

When they land, a shepherd informs Ebrahim he is near the castle of the King of the Eastern Lands. The sea-horse advises the prince to find work as a gardener's assistant and gives some of its hairs to the boy, to summon him in case he needs the animal's help, and goes to graze in his original homeland. Prince Ebrahim finds work as the royal gardener's assistant, spinning a story about being an orphan boy. One day, he sees his employer preparing flower bunches for the king's three daughters, and asks if he can arrange some and bring to the princesses. Ebrahim takes the flowers and goes to the terrace where the princesses are, and gives his bunch to the youngest, named Pari, to her sisters' envy. One day, Prince Ebrahim summons his sea-horse, for he wants to ride around the garden as the prince to impress princess Pari: both make a show of strength to her delight, who falls even more in love with him.

Later, the king orders for a crowd to be assembled in front of the palace, where the princesses shall choose their husbands by releasing a falcon at random and, whoever it lands on, they shall marry them. The first falcon lands on the head of the son of the vizier of the right hand, and the second on the son of the vizier of the left hand. The third falcon lands on the head of the gardener, Prince Ebrahim, but, knowing he is a poor choice, the guards remove him from the crowd. Ebrahim sits by the public baths, and the third falcon, released a second time, lands on his head again. Thinking the bird made the same mistake, the viziers order the boy to be taken back to his garden outside of the town. The third falcon is released a third time, and again it circles around in the air until it finds Ebrahim in the garden.

The king ponders about the situation (two fine sons-in-law for his elder daughters, a lowly one for his youngest), and decides to marry the elder two in grand ceremonies with pomp, while the youngest is wedded like a poor servant and moves out to a humble part of town. Time passes, and the king falls ill; the royal doctors prescribe that only meat from a gazelle, a deer or other game animal is to be given to him as remedy. Pari convinces her husband to join in the hunt, and asks her father to lend him a horse. Back to Prince Ebrahim, he summons his loyal horse again, and says it is almost time to end the charade, so that he is given the respect and honour he is due. The sea-horse understands the message, goes away for a while, then returns to fetch the prince. When they reach the wilderness, there is a large pavilion with a throne, and every wild animal has been herded there.

The king's two sons-in-law cannot find any game, until they sight the pavilion from a distance and go near it. They meet Prince Ebrahim, whom they do not recognize, and ask for some of the gazelles for the king. Prince Ebrahim makes a deal: the gazelle meat in exchange for branding the duo as his slaves. The sons-in-law agree to do it, since no one will know of the transaction, then go back to the king. Ebrahim keeps the gazelle heads for himself and asks his wife to prepare a dish for her father. The king eats the dishes made from the gazelle meat and does not recover, until he eats the dish made from the heads and his health improves.

Later, Ebrahim asks his wife to invite her father to visit their home, and he summons the sea-horse once again, so that their humble hut is turned into a wonderful palace. It happens overnight, and the king appears with his court to visit the newly built palace, which is richly decorated and furnished. After a splendid meal, the king wishes his host, whom he does not recognize as the gardener's assistant, could have been one of his sons-in-law. Prince Ebrahim then admits he is the gardener, and the king's son-in-law, while his brothers-in-law are Ebrahim's slaves, marked with a royal brand on their chests. The viziers' sons show their marks, confirming Ebrahim's story, and the king celebrates Pari's wedding to Ebrahim. At the end of the tale, Ebrahim returns to his homeland with his wife and slaves, and his sisters having repented of their previous actions.

== Analysis ==
=== Tale type ===
The tale is classified in the Aarne-Thompson-Uther Index as type ATU 314, "The Goldener": a youth with golden hair works as the king's gardener. The type may also open with the prince for some reason being the servant of an evil being, where he gains the same gifts, and the tale proceeds as in this variant. In this case, it is an "independent Near Eastern subtype of AT 314".

Professor Ulrich Marzolph, in his catalogue of Persian folktales, named type 314 in Iranian sources as Das Zauberfohlen ("The Magic Horse"): the horse saves the protagonist from jealous relatives and takes him to another kingdom; in this kingdom, the protagonist is advised by the horse to dress in shabby garments (as a "Kačal") and work as the king's gardener; a princess falls in love with him. Marzolph listed 17 variants of this type across Persian sources. In addition, according to Marzolph, the tale type, also known as Korre-ye daryā'i (German: Das Meeresfohlen; English: "The Sea Foal"), is one of the most collected types in the archives of Markaz-e farhang-e mardom (Centre of Popular Culture), and a well-known Iranian folktale.

==== Introductory episodes ====
Scholarship notes three different opening episodes to the tale type: (1) the hero becomes a magician's servant and is forbidden to open a certain door, but he does and dips his hair in a pool of gold; (2) the hero is persecuted by his stepmother, but his loyal horse warns him and later they both flee; (3) the hero is given to the magician as payment for the magician's help with his parents' infertility problem. Folklorist Christine Goldberg, in Enzyklopädie des Märchens, related the second opening to former tale type AaTh 532, "The Helpful Horse (I Don't Know)", wherein the hero is persecuted by his stepmother and flees from home with his horse. (Note: According to Stith Thompson's 1961 revision of the index, in type 532 the hero's helpful horse advises him to answer every question with the sentence "I don't know".)

American folklorist Barre Toelken recognized the spread of the tale type across Northern, Eastern and Southern Europe, but identified three subtypes: one that appears in Europe (Subtype 1), wherein the protagonist becomes the servant to a magical person, finds the talking horse and discovers his benefactor's true evil nature, and acquires a golden colour on some part of his body; a second narrative (Subtype 3), found in Greece, Turkey, Caucasus, Uzbekistan and Northern India, where the protagonist is born through the use of a magical fruit; and a third one (Subtype 2). According to Toelken, this Subtype 2 is "the oldest", being found "in Southern Siberia, Iran, the Arabian countries, Mediterranean, Hungary and Poland". In this subtype, the hero (who may be a prince) and the foal are born at the same time and become friends, but their lives are at stake when the hero's mother asks for the horse's vital organ (or tries to kill the boy to hide her affair), which motivates their flight from their homeland to another kingdom.

=== Motifs ===
Professor Anna Birgitta Rooth stated that the motif of the stepmother's persecution of the hero appears in tale type 314 in variants from Slavonic, Eastern European and Near Eastern regions. She also connected this motif to part of the Cinderella cycle, in a variation involving a male hero and his cow.

==== The suitor selection test ====
In Iranian tales about the sea-horse, the princess throws an apple to her suitor - a motif indexed as motif H316, "Suitor test: apple thrown indicates princess' choice (often golden apple)". According to mythologist Yuri Berezkin and other Russian researchers, the motif is "popular" in Iran, and is also attested "in Central Europe, the Balkans, the Caucasus, the Near East, and Central Asia". In the same vein, professor Mahomed-Nuri Osmanovich Osmanov noted that the motif of the princess throwing an item to choose her husband is "widespread" ("распространение", in the original) in tales from the Iranian peoples.

According to Turkologist Karl Reichl, types ATU 314 and ATU 502 contain this motif: the princess chooses her own husband (of lowly appearance) in a gathering of potential suitors, by giving him an object (e.g., an apple). However, he also remarks that the motif is "spread in folk literature" and may appear in other tale types.

Germanist Günter Dammann, in Enzyklopädie des Märchens, argued that Subtype 2 (see above) represented the oldest form of the Goldener narrative, since the golden apple motif in the suitor selection roughly appears in the geographic distribution of the same subtype.

===== Literary parallels =====
Some scholars have compared the motif to marriage rites and customs attested in ancient literature. For example, Günter Dammann, in Enzyklopädie des Märchens, compared the motif to the Indian ritual of svayamvara, and reported evidence of a similar practice in Ancient Iran.

French folklorist Emmanuel Cosquin noted that the suitor selection test was component of a larger narrative: the princess or bride-to-be chooses the hero, in lowly disguise, by throwing him an apple. According to him, this motif would be comparable to the ancient Indian ritual of svayamvara, wherein the bride, in a public gathering, would choose a husband by giving him a garland of flowers. In addition, Swedish scholar Waldemar Liungman (1948), who argued for its remote antiquity, saw in the golden apple motif a mark of the princess's self-choice of husband, and traced a parallel between it and a narrative cited by Aristotle regarding the founding of Massalia (modern day Marseille).

Similarly, in an ancient treatise written by historian Mirkhond, translated by linguist David Shea, it is reported that prince Gushtasp went to the land of "Room" during a suitor selection test held by princess Kitabun: as it was custom, a maiden of marriageable age was to walk through an assemblage of noble men with an orange and throw it to her husband-to-be. Gushtasp attends the event and the princess throws her orange to him, indicating her choice.

In regards to a similar tale from the Dungan people, according to Sinologist Boris L. Riftin, the motif of a princess (or woman of high social standing) throwing a silken ball atop a high tower to choose her husband is reported in the ancient Chinese story of "Lu Meng-Zheng": the princess throws a silken ball to a passing youth named Meng-Zheng (a poor student), and the king expels his daughter to live with her husband in a cave. In addition, some scholars (e.g., Ting Nai-tung, Wolfram Eberhard, Phra Indra Montri (Francis Giles)) remarked that a similar wedding folk custom (a maiden throwing a ball from a balcony to her husband of choice) was practiced among some Chinese minorities and in South China. The motif is also reported in ancient Chinese literature.

==== The gardener hero ====
Swedish scholar Waldemar Liungman drew attention to a possible ancient parallel to the gardener hero of the tale type: in an account of the story of king Sargon of Akkad, he, in his youth, works as a gardener in a palace and attracts the attention of goddess Ishtar. According to scholars Wolfram Eberhard and Pertev Naili Boratav, this would mean that the motif is "very old" ("sehr alt") in the Near East.

According to Richard MacGillivray Dawkins, in the tale type, the hero as gardener destroys and restores the garden after he finds work, and, later, fights in the war. During the battle, he is injured, and the king dresses his wound with a kerchief, which will serve as token of recognition.

==== The helpful horse ====
According to scholars James R. Russell and Wheeler Thackston, the bahri—the Persian term for 'merhorse' or 'sea-stallion'—appears in the folklore of Iranian peoples. (Note: However, the sea-born horse also appears in the folklore of Turkic peoples, either itself coming from a water body or being the result of a mating between a sea-stallion and a terrestrial mare.) On its own, the merhorse is a fantastical equine imbued with human speech, the ability to fly and other magical powers, and acts as the hero's helper. In addition, according to Gudrun Schubert and Renate Würsch, the horse may be known as Asp-i-baḥrī ('Meerpferd'), that is, an equine that lives in the sea or other water bodies. The merhorse or its foal also appear in epic tradition as the hero's mount. (Note: Although, according to researcher Elizabeth Lambourn and Indologist Wendy Doniger, the word bahri, 'from or of the sea' (in Lambourn) or 'seaborne' (in Doniger), refers to the importation of Arabian and Persian horses via maritime trade to South Asia, during the Sultanate period.)

==== Quest for the remedy ====
A motif that appears in tale type 314 is the hero having to find a cure for the ailing king, often the milk of a certain animal (e.g., a lioness). According to scholar Erika Taube, this motif occurs in tales from North Africa to East Asia, even among Persian- and Arabic-speaking peoples. Similarly, Hasan M. El-Shamy noted that the quest for the king's remedy appears as a subsidiary event "in the Arab-Berber culture area". In addition, Germanist Gunter Dammann, in Enzyklopädie des Märchens, noted that the motif of the quest for the remedy appeared "with relative frequency" in over half of the variants that start with the Subtype 2 opening (stepmother's persecution of hero and horse).

==== Branding the brothers-in-law ====
According to German scholars Günther Damman and Kurt Ranke, another motif that appears in tale type ATU 314 is the hero branding his brothers-in-law during their hunt. Likewise, Ranke stated that the hero's branding represented a mark of his ownership over his brothers-in-law.

Ranke located the motif in the Orient and in the Mediterranean. Similarly, according to Arthur Christensen, marking the brothers-in-law is "common" in the Oriental versions. In the same vein, Hungarian professor Ákos Dömötör, in the notes to tale type ATU 314 in the Hungarian National Catalogue of Folktales (MNK), remarked that the motif was a "reflection of the Eastern legal custom", which also appears in the Turkic epic Alpamysh.

== Variants ==
According to Germanist Gunter Dammann, tale type 314 with the opening of hero and horse fleeing home extends from Western Himalaya and South Siberia, to Iran and the Arab-speaking countries in the Eastern Mediterranean. In addition, scholar Hasan El-Shamy stated that type 314 is "widely spread throughout north Africa", among Arabs and Berbers; in sub-Saharan Africa, as well as in Arabia and South Arabia.

=== Iran ===
==== Story of the Sea Horse (Khanom) ====
In another Iranian tale collected from teller Mashdi Galin Khanom with the title "کره دریایی" ("Sea Foal"), and translated to Italian with the title Storia del cavallo marino ("Story of the Sea Horse"), a king dotes on his only son, whose mother died, to the chagrin of the other co-wives and their daughters. One day, the prince sights a sea horse on sale and takes the king to buy it for him. The king buys the horse and brings it to the royal stables, where they try to feed it sawdust, hay, and barley, but the horse touches nothing. The prince then feeds the animal with sweets and sugarcubes, which the horse accepts. In time, the king's co-wives realize that the prince is too attached to the horse, which means that by hurting the animal, they will hurt the prince. Thus, they bribe the pastry-maker to poison the animal's sugar rations. When the prince goes to the stables, the horse begins to cry and says that it sugar rations are poisoned, since they are trying to kill it to hurt the prince. The prince summons the pastry-maker ("pasticcere") and one of the dogs ("uno dei cani", in the Italian translation), feeds the poisoned sweets to the dog, which eats it and dies, just to show the servant the wicked plan. Failing that, the co-queens hire a builder to dig up a hole from outside to the prince's room, for him to fall into. The prince goes to visit the horse again, which warns him of the danger and advises the boy to jump over the carpet covering it. The prince tells his father, who chastises the co-queens, including one that has just given birth to a boy. Furious at another fail, the women bribe the cook to poison the prince's food. The talking sea horse warns the prince about it, who avoids eating the food, but gives it to another dog to eat. The prince then sumons the cook, points to a dead dog and confronts him about it. The queens discover the sea horse is helping their stepson, and conspire with the newly mothered woman to feign illness and ask for sea horse's meat as cure; the king will kill the horse, while they deal with the prince.

It happens thus: the king falls for her trick, and convenes with his ministers, who advise the prince's tutor shall hold the prince a bit longer at school while they sacrifice the horse. Meanwhile, the prince goes to visit the horse and learns they plan to kill it, so they hatch a counterplan: the prince will have some money, clothes and provisions at the ready, go to school with ashes in his pockets; the horse will neigh three times to alert the prince, who is to throw ashes at his teacher and rush to its aid, asking to have a last ride on the animal before it is killed. The next day, at school, the prince hears the neighs, throws some ash at his teacher's eyes and rushes to help his horse, asking his father to have a last ride around the patio three times. It happens thus, and the horse flies away with the prince through the air, until it lands near a garden. They ask a nearby shepherd whose garden it is: it belongs to the daughter of the King of the Eastern Lands. Advised by the horse, the prince eats some sheep meat with the shepherd, places a sheep's intestine on his head, and is given some hairs from its mane to summon the sea horse.

The prince then takes a job as the gardener's assistant. One day, the gardener tells the prince he is preparing some bouquets for the king's three daughters, and the prince offers to make one. The prince prepares a beautiful bouquet, and the gardener sends him to deliver them to the princesses: he gives the gardener's bouquets to the elder two and the one he made to the youngest. Later, the gardener tells his assistant he will leave town and orders him to look after the garden. After the gardener leaves, the prince burns his horse's hairs to summon it, dons the princely clothes, cuts a large tree in two, then dismisses his horse - events witnessed by the youngest princess. The gardener returns and the prince spins a story that some men attacked him, and the youngest princess vouches for him. The youngest princess falls in love with the prince, and conspires with her elder sisters how they can be married, despite being locked in their room: they have the gardener buy three melons of varying ripeness and deliver them to the king. It happens thus, and the ministers interpret the princesses' intention: the melons represent their marriageability, and it is past time they are wedded. The king orders a "falcon ordeal" to be prepared, and sends for young and old suitors to be gathered outside the palace, for the princesses will release falcons at random. The elder two release their birds, and they perch on ministers' sons, while the third princess's bird lands on the gardener's assistant. Thinking the bird made a mistake, the assistant is taken to outside the palace, then outside the city's walls, and still the bird lands on him. Ashamed, the king marries the elder two in grand ceremonies, and moves out the youngest to a humble house.

In time, the king falls ill, and only gazelle marrow can cure him. He sends his sons-in-law, the ministers' sons, to hunt some gazelles. The third princess also asks her husband to join in their hunt: the prince summons his loyal sea horse, which rides to the wilderness, builds a tent for its master and draws gazelles, rabbits and every species of animal to the tent. As for the ministers' sons, they have no luck in finding any game, when they spot the animals near the tent. When they try to shoot some gazelles, a servant comes out of the tent and ask them for his master's permission. The tent's occupant is the prince in his real identity, whom the ministers' sons do not recognize. The pair explain they need the meat for their king. The prince agrees to a deal: they can take gazelle meat, but not the heads. The ministers' sons bring gazelle meat, which is prepared into a dish for the monarch. The monarch eats the meal, but his health does not improve. The third princess prepares a dish with the gazelle head and the king's health improves. Impressed, the king invites himself to his daughter's house for a visit (on Friday, in the Italian translation). Back home, the princess tells her husband about the king's visit, but worries about their humble accommodations. The prince then summons his horse again, which creates a palaces for its master and his wife. On the appointed day, the king and his retinue reach his third daughter's house and find a palace instead of a hut. The prince, now assuming his real identity, greets his father-in-law and explains he is the son of the king of the Levant, exiled from home due to his stepmothers' machinations. The king of the Eastern Lands embraces his princely son-in-law and declares him his successor.

==== Sea Horse (Sobhi) ====
In a Persian tale collected by author Fazl'ollah Mohtadi Sobhi and translated into Russian by Anna Rozenfel'd with the title "Морской конёк" ("Sea Horse"), young prince Jamshid loses his mother. On words of a wise man, his father, the padishah, decides to give him a wonderful gift: a horse from the sea, which shall become the boy's best friend. On his orders, his knights capture a horse just as it comes out of the sea. The sea horse is given to Jamshid, and both become great friends. In time, the padishah remarries, and Jamshid grows up; his wife, the prince's step-mother, begins to notice her step-son in a sexual light and tries to seduce him, but he refuses her advances. Out of spite, she conspires with a slave to kill the prince: first, they dig up a hole, fill it with blades and spears, and cover it; next, they try to poison his food. On both occasions, the sea horse warns Jamshid about the danger. The step-mother discovers the horse's help and plots to have it killed: she feigns illness and asks for its heart and liver. Jamshid returns from school one day, and is told of the horse's upcoming execution, so he and the animal devise a plan: the horse will neigh three times, and Jamshid shall meet him before the butcher's strike. The next day, it happens as they planned; Jamshid asks his father to ride the sea horse around the estate one last time. The prince circles the garden six or seven times, then jumps over the garden walls into the unknown and away from his home kingdom. At a distance, the sea horse gives some of its hair to Jamshid, which he can use to summon it, and they part ways. Jamshid goes to another city, where he finds work as assistant to the king's gardener. The king has three daughters, the youngest the most beautiful of the three. The gardener and Jamshid prepare bouquets for the princesses, who notice their delicate craftsmanship. Ten days after parting ways, Jamshid summons the sea horse for a ride around the royal garden - an event witnessed by the youngest princess. Some time later, the three princesses bring melons to their father, the king, as analogy of their marriageability, and the king sets a suitor selection test: the princesses are to throw oranges at their husbands of choice. The elder princess chooses the son of the vizier of the right hand, the middle one the son of the vizier of the left hand, and the princess chooses the gardener's assistant. Much to his disgust, the king expels the youngest princess to a humble life out of the palace, and, after seven days, begins to miss her terribly, so much so he falls ill. The royal doctors then prescribe heads and legs of a gazelle in a dish prepares by the princess, and the three sons-in-law must hunt it down. Prince Jamshid rides ahead of them, summons the sea horse and prepares a large tent for him. He meets his brothers-in-law, who ask him for a piece of gazelle meat. Prince Jamshid agrees to share some of them, as long as he can brand his shoulders with his royal seal. Later, after the king eats the gazelle meat, Jamshid summon the sea horse again and asks for a palace more grandiose than his father-in-law's. He approaches the king and demands his two slaves, and, as proof of his claims, points to his two brothers-in-law. The king then sees his daughter next to Jamshid, and is given an explanation of the ruse. At the end of the tale, Jamshid returns home to cure his father (who has become blind after his son left home), ousts his step-mother, and gets to rule both kingdoms after his father and father-in-law die.

==== The Merhorse (Luristan) ====
In a variant from Luristan with the title The Merhorse (Luri language: Bahrî), collected from teller Khudâbas (Xudâwas) of Bahârvand, a king has a son who owns a foal he found in the sea. One day, the king remarries, and the new queen tries to seduce her step-son. He refuses her advances, and she conspires against him: first, she tries to poison her step-son's food twice, but the prince's friend, the merhorse, warns him against eating the food; next, she feigns sickness and asks for the meat of the prince's merhorse. The prince learns of this and plots with the horse: on the day of the animal's execution, the boy is to be allowed a last ride on it, and must take the opportunity to flee. It happens according to their plan and they reach another kingdom. The horse gives the prince some of its hairs and advises the boy to find work in the city. The prince disguises himself as a poor beggar and finds shelter with a poor old woman. The king of this city has seven daughters, and arranges a suitor selection test: the princesses are to release hawks at random, and they shall marry whoever the birds land next to. The prince, in his beggar disguise, goes to the ceremony, and the youngest princess's hawk lands near him. The king marries his seventh daughter to the beggar, much to his disgust, and expels her to a shabby hut. Later, the king becomes blind, and only some meat can cure him. The king's sons-in-laws go on a hunt, while the prince rides behind them. At a distance, he takes off the lousy disguise, puts on regal clothes and builds a tent, where he rests after getting more game than his brothers-in-law. He meets the king's other sons-in-law and agrees to share his game, in exchange for branding their rumps. Later, the kingdom goes to war, and the prince summons the merhorse, which he rides into battle to win the war in his father-in-law's favour. In his noble clothes, the prince then goes to meet the king and demands his six slaves, which are the other sons-in-law with marks on their bodies.

==== Black Colt (Lori province) ====
In an Iranian tale titled "کرّة سیاه" ("Black Colt"), sourced from Lori province, a king has two wives and no children. A man named Sayyid meets him and gives him an apple, to be given to the two co-queens. The king follows Sayyid's instructions, but the first wife eats half, while the other half is eaten by a sheep. Some time later, the sheep gives birth to a boy, whom the king takes to the first queen to raise and names him Ali Mishza. After the first queen dies, Ali Mishza discovers that a mare goes to foal near the sea, and, on one occasion, trails behind the mare to rescue its next foal from the sea. The boy takes the foal, of a black fur, to raise. Years pass, and Ali Mishza turns into a handsome youth that the king's second wife falls in love with, but he rejects her advances. Spurned, the second queen tries to destroy her step-son with the help of a seven-headed monster, but the black foal warns him of the dangers. Realizing that the foal is protecting the boy, she feigns illness and asks for the meat of the black foal as cure. The king is ready to sacrifice the horse to fulfill the queen's request, but Ali Mishza asks for a last ride on the animal around the palace. The plan works: Ali Mishza and the black foal fly away beyond the sea to another country, the foal gives a tuft of its mane to the boy, then gallops away. Ali Mishza goes to a nearby city, where he finds work as a cowherd. One day, he summons the black foal by burning its hairs and ride around, an event witnessed by the king's youngest daughter, who falls in love with him. Some time later, the king summons his seven daughters and prepares a suitor selection test: eligible suitors are to gather, and the princesses are to give an apple to their husband of choice. The youngest princess gives her apple to Ali Mishza, to the king's horror, who banishes his daughter to live a lowly life with the youth. Despite the mocking the youngest princess and Ali Miszha suffer, the youth proves his worth and inherits the kingdom from his father-in-law.

==== The Marine Colt ====
In an Iranian tale titled "كره اسب دريايي" (lit. 'korre asb daryâyi', 'The Marine Colt'), prince Malek Ibrahim is doted on by his father, but hated by his stepmother. One day, a man brings the prince a horse from the sea which is fed with sweets. Later, Malek Ibrahim finds his horse friend in tears, and the animal explains the queen wishes to give him poisoned food. With the horse's warning, he avoids the food, despite his stepmother's trick during the meal. The next time, a hole was dug out and filled with a spear and a blade and covered with a carpet, which the prince jumps over to avoid the new trap. The third time, the horse predicts the queen will aim for the animal next while the prince is at school, so the animal will neigh three times to warn him. The next morning, the queen feigns illness and bribes a doctor to prescribe the liver of a marine horse as cure. The king's ministers try to look for a marine horse, until eventually one suggests they sacrifice the prince's pet horse.

The next day, Malek Ibrahim goes to school and hears his horse's neighing, throws ashes at his teacher's eyes and coins to the other students to create a distraction - just as the horse instructed him to do -, and rushes back home. The prince confronts his father about the killing his horse friend, and asks for one last ride on the animal, with his finest garments on, a saddle, an armor and some money in a khurjin. The king allows it; the prince gallops twice around the garden, jumps over the people and flies away to another place. While the prince is away, the king divorces his wife, punishes his minister and mourns for his son. After prince and horse land near the garden of another king, the animal advises the prince to trade clothes with a shepherd, buy a sheep and use its skin on his head, and find work with the king as his gardener. The horse also gives him some of its hairs to summon it, then departs.

It happens thus. One day, he summons his horse on a summer's day for a ride around the garden - an event witnessed by the king's youngest daughter from her room, where she also discusses with her elder sisters their marriage plans. Thus, they send for a servant to bring three melons to the king, which his minister explains are an analogy for their marriageability. The king then assembles a crowd of eligible suitors in front of the palace, each holding a golden orange near their chest for the princesses to shoot arrows at: the elder shoots to a minister's son, the middle one to the son of a man of law, while the youngest stays her hand, since her suitor is absent. The king then orders his guards to bring any male they find: the lowly gardener's assistant is forcibly brought, despite some initial refusal, and the youngest princess shoots her arrow at his orange. He questions the reason for such an action, and is told he was chosen as the princess's suitor. The youth does not wish to be married, but the king weds him to his daughter, and has them move out to a shed, while he marries the elder two in a seven-day and seven-night celebration.

Time passes; the king falls ill, and the doctors prescribe gazelle meat as cure. The king's sons-in-law ride to a hunt, and the youngest princess convinces her lowly husband to join them. He is given an old horse and a weapon, but, out of sight, summons his loyal horse and requests it to round up all deer in a fence, place a predator to guard them, and erect a tent. It happens thus. Meanwhile, his brothers-in-law meet a farmer, who tells them the "king of animals" fenced the deer in, and placed tigers, lions and wild animals around it. The brothers-in-law ride up the hill and meet Malek Ibrahim, who they do not recognize as the gardener, and ask for some deer meat. Malek Ibrahim agrees to a deal: first, they have to be branded on their feet with Malek Ibrahim's royal seal; then, they can have a carcass for themselves, but its head belongs to Malek Ibrahim. The men agree to a deal, and bring the meat to the king, who eats it, but his health does not improve. Later, Malek Ibrahim returns home, puts on the poor man's disguise, and gives his wife the deer head to prepare a dish for the king. The king eats the dish and restores his health.

Finally, war breaks out against an enemy king. The enemy army reaches the kingdom's gates, and Malek Ibrahim summons his horse again, this time to fight to protect his father-in-law's realm. He vanquishes his enemies, then goes to meet the king, his father-in-law, in search of his two runaway slaves. The prince points to his brothers-in-law, to the king's astonishment, and they show their branded feet. Malek Ibrahim bursts in laughter, and tells the king he is the son of the king of Iran. The youngest princess knew of his true identity, and married him anyway, despite his lowly disguise. Malek Ibrahim brings his wife home to his father in Iran.

==== The Peerless Knight and the Fairy-Horse ====
Researcher Adrienne Boulvin collected an Iranian tale from Khorasan. In this tale, titled Le Cavalier Nonpareil et le Cheval-Fée ("The Peerless Knight and the Fairy-Horse"), the widowed governor of a village near Balkh marries another woman. However, the woman begins to hate her stepson, since her husband loves him, to her jealousy, and makes the domestic situation unbearable. Due to this, the boy resorts to hunting as a pastime and, one day, spots a horse and its foal munching on some herbs in a meadow, when a lion appears to attack the animals. The mare jumps in the ocean and abandons its young (which the tale says it is a "poulain-marin", a 'sea colt'), which is saved by the youth and brought to his home to be nursed. The youth's stepmother learns of his adventure and knows the horse is magical, able to remove all sorts of problems, so she plots to kill it: she feigns illness and convinces the village doctors to prescribe the heart of the fairy-horse as a cure. The woman's husband falls for the deception and prepares to kill his son's horse. The youth goes to say goodbye to his pet horse, which is told the situation. The horse then bids the youth ask for a last ride on the horse around the house before the execution, then the horse will take flight with him. It happens thus, and, during their flight, the youth shouts at his father the stepmother dyed her skin with curcuma to appear ill.

After their aerial escape, the horse lands near a green city and gives some of its hairs for the youth to burn and summon it. The youth ties his fine garments on the horse, puts on a shabby vest and goes to a garden to pick some fruits. The Shah's gardener finds the youth and adopts him as his son and apprentice. The youth learns his trade and works until the season when the roses are in bloom, and fashions beautiful bouquets. The old gardener brings the bouquets for the Shah's three daughters, who notice they are different from previous years. The youngest princess then decides to spy on the garden: she sees the youth taking a bath in a lake and throws him an apple. The youth sees her and falls in love. The youngest princess comments with her elder sisters about their future marriages, and sends their father three green melons, which the Shah interprets correctly: it is time to marry the princesses. So he orders for eligible suitors to assemble at the grand square for the princesses to choose their husbands by throwing bitter oranges ('oranges amères', in the original) to their suitors of choice. The elder throws hers to a vizier's son and the middle one for a vakil's son, but the youngest withholds hers. Noticing his cadette's reaction, the Shah orders the guards to bring in everyone that is absent, and they find gardener's assistant and bring him to the square. The youngest princess throws her orange to the lowly youth, and they marry, despite the Shah's sadness.

Later, the Shah summons his three sons-in-law for a hunt. The vizir's son and the vakil's son insult the gardener's son and ride ahead of him to the hunting ground. The youth then summons his fairy-horse and asks it to gather the animals for himself and set up a tent. His brothers-in-law find nothing and ride until they find the tent and several animals roaming about. They ask the tent's occupant, a man with a mask, if he can sell some of his game. The masked one agrees, as long as they agree to be branded on their backs with a seal. They make a deal, and the masked one prepares the carcasses, but, first, he chants as spell over the meat - as instructed by the fairy-horse - to remove the meat's flavour, and keeps the heads for himself. The two sons-in-law invite the Shah for dinner in their respective palaces to eat the animals they hunted, but the meat is tasteless and smells bad. The Shah then pays a visit to his gardener son-in-law and eats the dish with relish, and decides to gift him a palace.

Some time later, war breaks out, and the Shah's forces cannot defeat the enemies, until a masked youth appears on the battlefield to turn the tide of the battle. The Shah orders the masked man to be brought before him so he can be properly rewarded. The masked one says he wants nothing save for his two runaway slaves, branded with a mark on their backs. The king orders his sons-in-law to show their bodies, and there are marks on them. The masked one then reveals himself as the gardener's son, and retells his whole story, and asks if he can bring his wife with him to his father's village. The Shah agrees, and the youth rides back to his village with his retinue, where he is welcomed by his father and friends.

==== The Black Foal (Khosravi) ====
In a tale collected by researcher Hossein Khosravi with the title "کره اسب‌ سیاه" ("Black Horse Foal"), a poor couple have a son named Murad. The boy is but a baby when his mother dies and his father remarries, having two sons with his new wife. Murad excels at school, to their step-family's great jealousy. One day, he and his brothers are fishing, and Murad fetches from the sea a large black foal, which he brings home to be his friend. His half-brothers grow increasingly jealous and demand their mother gives them the horse, so the woman plots to get rid of Murad: first, she tries to poison his rice dish, but Murad is alerted by the horse and avoids the food. Next, they dig up a hole on the ground, place blades and spears inside it, cover it and bid Murad sit at that spot. However, Murad is once again alerted by his pet horse and avoids siting on it, letting one of his half-brothers die in his place. Suffering for the loss of one of her sons, the stepmother feigns illness and bribes some doctors to prescribe the meat of the black foal as cure for her. Murad's father falls for his wife's trick and decides to sacrifice the horse the next day. Meanwhile, Murad and the horse discuss the animal's impending sacrifice and plot their own plan: the foal will neigh three times while Murad is at school; he is to rush back home and ask his father for one last ride on the horse. The next day, their plan works thus, and Murad asks his father to spare the horse for one last ride around. The man agrees; the duo ride some laps, then jump over a pole and gallop nonstop for seven days and nights, until they reach a walled garden. Inside, a king is being entertained by some people on a carpet. The foal tells Murad to find work in the garden, and says it will return to the sea, but gives the boy some of its hairs to summon it by burning them, then departs.

Murad buys a sheep's rumen and places it on his head as to appear bald, and enters the garden to ask for a job. The king and his guests look at him with strangeness, but the young princess, who is there with them, knows the boy is not bald, since she saw him on the black horse, and convinces her father to hire him. It happens thus. Some time later, the king announces his three daughters are to be married, and nobles and princes flock to the palace so the girls can choose their husbands by giving them bergamots. The elder two princesses choose sons of ministers, but the youngest cannot see the gardener and withholds her fruit. The king sends the guards to bring every men in the kingdom to the assemblage. They bring the bald gardener, to whom the third princess gives the fruit - to the king's outrage, who banishes her from his palace to live with the poor gardener in his hut. Later, the king falls ill, and the royal doctors prescribe the meat of a very rare breed of game as remedy. The ministers' sons ride into the wilderness to hunt for the king, while Murad is given a lame mount and a broken bow. He then summons his foal and asks it to round up all the game there is and set up a tent for them. It happens thus. Back to the ministers' sons, they cannot hunt any game and are ready to return empty-handed to the palace, until they see a tent and go to investigate. They see Murad, whom they do not recognize, and ask for some of the meat the latter has. Murad agrees to a deal: the meat in exchange or being branded on their backs. The brothers-in-law make the deal, believing no one will be aware of the exchange, while Murad separates some carcasses, uttering over them for the taste to go to the heads, not to the bodies.

The ministers' sons are given the game and invite the king to partake of a meal they prepared. The king goes to their palaces and eats a tasteless dish, then goes to his youngest daughter's hut and eats the head dish. He then complains that there is straw in his food, and moves them out to the palace kitchen. The same events happen again, but this time the king complains about the smell of smoke, and decides to have them move out to a cottage in the corner of the royal gardens. The third time, the king eats the tasty meal the third princess prepared, despite finding some fallen leaves on the plate, and declares they should move back to the palace the next day. After the king leaves, Murad summons the horse and requests for a large palace to be built overnight. The next morning, the king and his court take notice of the strange palace and decide to enter it. The king sees Murad, whom he does not recognize, and the boy reveals he is the king's son-in-law, disguised as Murad Kechal, the bald gardener. He also explains he brought him the meat his brothers-in-law claim to have hunted, and the ministers' sons hang their heads in shame, confirming the tale. The king then asks Murad to forgive him for the mistreatment and offers to make him king, but Murad chooses to be his minister.

==== Del Del (Qoshan) ====
In an Iranian tale collected from a source in Qoshan with the title "دل دل" ("Del Del"), the prince finds a mare, which the Al-khun explains can give birth to a "Dil Dil", but everytime she foals she throws her colt in the sea. The Al-khun tells the prince to help him restrain the mare the next time it gives birth, so he can have the foal on land with him. It happens thus, and the mare gives birth to a foal, which the prince Abdullah is instructed to feed on raisins for six months before he can ride the animal. His brothers, who ride around on their own horses, invite Abdullah to join them, but the youth's mount is not yet ready. His brothers realize the foal is of rare stock, from Del Del, and they wish to kill their sibling and have the animal for themselves. One day, he meets up with Del Del and finds it crying; the foal alerts him his brothers have dug up a hole for him to fall in, but he can simply jump over it. He does that. Realizing they cannot have the foal, the princes' mother rubs saffron on her face, feigns illness and asks for the meat of the foal. Abdullah meets with Del Del again, this time the horse warns they plan to kill it. Prince Abdullah meets his father and complains that his brothers ride their horses every day, so he should ride Del Del at least once. The king indulges his son, and both the prince and the animal escape into the desert, away from the kingdom. They climb up a mountain, then stop to rest and eat. Del Del advises the prince to wash his hair in a waterfall of golden water, which gilds his hair, then they make their way to a flock of sheep. The prince buys a sheep's stomach to wear as a cap, Del Del gives him some of its hairs, to be burnt in case he needs its help, and they part ways. Abdullah makes way to a city where he finds work with an old man, who is the royal gardener. The gardener prepares bouquets for the king's three daughters every day, and one day Abdullah asks him about it. The man answers him. Abdullah takes the chance to tease a sheep to distract the gardener, while he ties a strand of his golden hair in one of the bouquets. The three princesses are given the bouquets, but the third princess notices the golden strand and keeps the one that has it for herself. Some time later, she goes to the roof of the palace and spies on the gardener's assistant without his cap, and swoons at the sight. Her maidservants go to help her. Some days later, the princesses send melons to their father as analogy to their marriageability, which they explain to the king. The monarch then gathers all eligible suitors for the princesses to choose their husbands by grabbing their hands: the elder chooses the minister's son and the middle one the attorney's son, while the youngest remains still. The king then orders everyone to be brought to the ceremony; the soldiers find Abdullah in the desert and bring him. The third princess holds his hand, to her father and sisters' horror. The king gives palaces for his elder daughters, and banishes the cadette to the stables. Later the king's sons-in-law go on a hunt, and so does Abdullah: the prince summons Del Del by burning its hair, and they set up a tent atop a mountain, where many animals flock to them. The brothers-in-law sight the tent and go up the mountain, meeting Abdullah, whom they do not recognize. They complain to the stranger they could not find any game, and Abdullah offers them some under one condition: to be branded with a burning coin on their feet. A deal is made, and the brothers-in-law take some sheep for their wives to cook for the king. The elder princesses' dishes are tasteless, causing the king to expel both from the palace, while the youngest's meal, made with heads and hooves, is tasty to the monarch and his wife. Later, a foreign king sends a letter demanding one of the princesses in marriage to his son, and, on being refused, declares war. The conflict lasts for three days, and Abdullah, on the third day, joins in the fray, killing the enemy army, then returning to his wife, who wraps up a strip of her clothes around his wound. The king, his father-in-law, realizes Abdullah is his gardener son-in-law and nominates him as his successor, but he has first to choose a minister and an attorney. Abdullah says he has already done it, and the other two sons-in-law show their branded soles. Abdullah then makes his brothers- and sisters-in-law his servants.

==== Bahram and the Fairy Horse ====
In an Iranian tale collected by Iranian scholar Mohsen Mihandoost and translated as Bahram and the Fairy Horse, a king has seven daughters and no son. The princesses go the rooftops to watch the sunrise and walk in the gardens near the lake. In the city near the palace, lives a poor orphan boy named Bahram. Despite his situation, he excels at school until graduation, and departs for the desert. While walking in the desert, a man on a horse approaches him, who he recognizes as an old schoolmate. Bahram notices the nice horse, and his former schoolmate says he found it by going to a spring up the mountains, where a white horse was coming out of the spring; he fed the white horse with bread and earned its trust to later ride it. Bahram decides to do the same, so he goes back to the city and buys loaves of bread, then goes to the same spring. He sees a white horse walking on the surface of the water and tosses some bread to it; the horse eats it. This goes on for the following days. After a whole year, Bahram is near penniless and goes to the spring a final time. He shouts at the horse that he is a poor boy, but bought bread for the horse, so either the horse comes out to help him, or he will leave forever. Moved by his words, the horse comes out of the spring and lets Bahram climb on it. Both ride across the desert until sunset, when Bahram goes to sleep under a tree and the horse under water. During the night, two green parrots begin to talk and comment that Bahram could change his life if he goes to the lake next to the king's castle. Bahram pretends to be asleep and overhears their conversation. The following morning, the horse tells Bahram it also heard the birds' conversation and allows the boy to have some hairs from its mane, then advises him to bathe in the lake that the king's seven daughters watch, but he has to buy a sheep's stomach, a cane and some shabby clothes, then departs. Bahram goes to the city to buy the items, then goes to swim in the lake at night. This draws the attention of the princesses, who go down the lake to meet this handsome stranger, but find an old man instead, to their disappointment. Bahram repeats these actions according to the horse's instructions, and goes to sleep in a bathhouse in the city.

One morning, the king's squire wakes a disguised Bahram to have him join the population for the suitor selection test for the princesses: the king is to release a hawk, and whoever the hawk lands on shall become the king's son-in-law. The king's hawk lands on the heads of six noblemen for the elder princesses. For the youngest, the hawk flies in to the bathhouse and lands on Bahram's head. The princess accepts the hawk's actions, but the king refuses to have his cadette marry a poor old man, and releases the bird seven more times, each time the bird landing on Bahram's head. Defeated, the king postpones the suitor selection for another time. At night, Bahram makes a campfire and burns one of the horse's hairs to summon him. The horse appears to him with nice and beautiful garments, which he says is for Bahram to wear only in front of the princess, then leaves. Bahram goes to take a swim in the lake under the seventh princess's watch, then goes out of the lake before sunset and just before the princess comes to ask anything. The following morning, the king prepares to release the hawk again, and this time, like before, it enters the bathhouse and lands on Bahram, who is disguised as an old man. The princess insists this is her fate, as decided by the hawk, and the king marries her off, but moves her out of the palace to a stable in the forest. In the forest, she cries for the situation, when Bahram shows his true identity to her, calming her.

Some time later, the king's sons-in-law go on a hunt, and Bahram, in the guise of an old man, wants to join them. He burns one of the horse's hairs to summon its help, and the equine appears with a piece of magical bark, on which Bahram is to write a wish for the animals to come and Bahram is to sit in the middle of them in his normal appearance. It happens thus, and Bahram draws the animals towards himself. The sons-in-law soon meet with Bahram, which they do not recognize, and ask it they could hunt some animals, since they had no luck before. Bahram proposes a deal: they are allowed to hunt the animals, in exchange for being branded with hot iron on their hips. The sons-in-law refuse and return empty-handed, while Bahram asks an animal to make its meat taste good, then dons his old man disguise to bring the meat to the king. The monarch is surprised the other sons-in-law came back with nothing, and asks the princess to prepare a dish with the meat. The princess adds some sheep droppings in the dish and presents it to her father, explaining that she lives in the stables with no utensils. For this, the king expels his daughter. The following day, the six sons-in-law return to the forest and ask Bahram for some meat, so they agree to let themselves be branded with hot iron on their hips. The group agrees, and Bahram gives them the deer meat, but he asked a deer to make its meat repulsive. The sons-in-law return with the deer meat and their wives prepare dishes with the repulsive-tasting meat, which the king spits out. Bahram tells the princess to explain to the king that it was Bahram who hunted the meat, and that the sons-in-law are to show their backsides to prove the story. The king does not believe the story at first, so he sends for the sons-in-law, who show their backsides with Bahram's brand. Now convinced, the king lets the princess and Bahram move back to the palace, and he nominates Bahram to help him in court duties.

==== King Deshwar and Prince Ibrahim ====
In a tale collected in Qaradagh, East Azerbaijan, with the title "داستان پادشاه ذشوار و ابراهیم" ("King Deshwar and Prince Ibrahim") and with the Azeri title İBRAHİM VƏ DÜŞVAR PADŞAH ("Ibrahim and Dushvar Padshah"), King Deshwar has a son named Ibrahim, whose mother dies to a disease. One day, while walking on the beach, king and prince find some aquatic horses coming out of the sea with their black-coated foal in tow. Prince Ibrahim spots the black foal and wants to have it, to which the king consents. Ibrahim and the black foal become good friends, they grow up together, and Ibrahim goes to school. The king is also a widower, and married a second queen that hates her stepson. Her grudge grows over time, until she tells the king she wants the prince killed. The king disagrees with the idea, but the queen says she will do the deed herself. First, she digs up a well near the entrance to the palace and covers it with a carpet, as a trap for the prince to fall into. When the prince returns from school, he goes to meet the black foal, which warns him about the well. Thus, Ibrahim escapes by jumping over the carpet, and lies that he was taught so in school. The queen orders the hole to be filled with earth, and moves to another attempt: poisoning his food. The black horse warns the prince again: the prince feeds a pet cat with some of the food and avoids eating the dish. The king and queen set their sights on the black horse, since they suspect the horse is warning the prince. The next day, prince Ibrahim meets his equine friend and finds him in tears, since, this time, it is its life that is at stake, for the queen's doctor prescribed the liver of a sea horse to cure her. The horse then informs that it will whinny three times to alert Ibrahim, when they are guiding it to the yard to be sacrificed, and they bribed the schoolteacher to hold him at school. Ibrahim fears to the horse, but attends school. During schooltime, he hears the whinnies and wants to leave to help his foal friend, but the teacher forbids him. Still, the prince disobeys and runs away from school to assist the foal. He jumps on his horse and asks him to be killed with the horse. The vizier and the lawyer advise the king to simply banish the prince from the kingdom.

Prince Ibrahim is exiled with his foal friend and reaches another kingdom, where he finds a garden. He asks for the garden-keeper to worked there and is hired as a helper. The horse asks Ibrahim to let it loose, and gives him some hairs from its mane, for him to summon the horse when he needs it. The prince works for his employer, to the latter's happiness. The man has two daughters, and the eldest wishes to marry Ibrahim. Her father consents. One day, the king's officials come to talk to Ibrahim's father-in-law for reinforcements to the local king's army to fight in a war. Ibrahim offers to go to war and promises to return safely. At a distance, he rubs two of his horse's hairs to summon it, commissions a sharp sword from the blacksmith and rides into battle. From his position, he defeats the enemy troops on his black horse. The local king does not recognize Ibrahim and sends an envoy to inquire him about his origins and prowess. Ibrahim is brought before the king and asked about his abilities, when they receive news about the enemy army entering from the other side. Ibrahim rides to the other side of the battlefield and defeats the remaining army. The king admires Ibrahim's martial prowess and wishes that they have such black horses in his army and make Ibrahim king. Ibrahim thanks the king for the offer, but wants to return to his homeland: the province of King Deshwar.

The local king gives his blessing to Ibrahim, who takes his wife and returns home with his wife to his homeland. He builds a tent with his black horse on the outskirts of the town. King Deshwar's officials sight Ibrahim, who they do not recognize, and approach him. Ibrahim's wife says that men are coming for him, and Ibrahim welcomes his father's officials, but cuts the ear of an envoy and issues an ultimatum for his father: either his father kills his wife and bring her head, otherwise there will be war. King Deshwar refuses to kill his second wife, and sends his army to the battlefield. Ibrahim defeats and kills his father's army and repeats his ultimatum, promising to spare his father, but he still wants the queen to die by his father's own hands. With no alternative, King Deshwar kills his wife and sends her head to Ibrahim. Prince Ibrahim tells his father that his father will reign and he will make the country prosperous.

Years later, Ibrahim becomes king, marries a second wife, and has children with each wife: a son by the first wife, called Muhammad, and two sons by the second, called Ali and Hussein. At one time, when Ibrahim is reorganizing the realm to his liking and has built a magnificent palace, a local old woman says that the palace is incredible, but it needs a peacock to sing in the city. Ibrahim's three sons decide to look for the bird for their father, and depart on a journey: on the road, his two half-brothers choose a road, while prince Muhammad goes through another road. Muhammad meets an old man that gives him directions: there is a forest, with a large spring and a large plane tree where a skull castle where a humay bird lives with its chicks, which are devoured every year by a dragon, so he is to kill the dragon and ensure the humay bird's help to find the peacock, which is in the possession of a lady that lives in the sun's sphere. Prince Muhammad breaks into the lady's castle, unties thirty-nine of her clothes, steals the peacock and returns to the humay bird. The lady wakes up in her castle, discovers the bird is gone, and takes her lion's army to King Ibrahim's realm to punish the thief. Meanwhile, Muhammad goes to help his brothers by buying their freedom, and in return they throw Muhammad in a well and steal the peacock to take credit for the deed.

=== Asia ===
==== South Asia ====
===== Balochistan =====
In a Balochi tale collected by Iranist Ivan Zarubin and published with the title "О кознях мачехи и приключениях царевича" ("About the stepmother's intrigue and the prince's adventures"), a king has three sons, two by a first wife, and a third by a second (deceased) wife. One day, the king gives fine horses to the elder two and an old one to the youngest. The youngest's horse goes to foal near the water and someone pulls its legs from inside the water, while the third prince pulls from the other side. The person ceases their action, and recommends the prince feeds the foal with black sheep's milk. Later, the king's first wife plans to kill her step-son: first by giving him poisoned bread, then digs up a hole and covers with a carpet. With the foal's help, the prince avoids both dangers. Lastly, she feigns illness and asks for meat of the foal of a water horse. The foal warns the prince and both hatch a plan: the horse will whinny eight times to alert him; he is to come and ask for a last ride on it, then they must make their escape. The next day, the king plans the horse's execution, and everything happens according to their plan: the prince flies away with the horse, and leaves a letter telling the king of the step-mother's plan. During the journey, the prince helps a female div and gains some of her hairs to summon her and her family in the hour of need. Next, the prince kills a snake to protect a nest of Simurgh chicks, and gains some feathers. Finally, he buys some sheep skin to use as a cap, and finds work under the royal gardener. The next day, while the princesses are away bathing, the prince summons his loyal foal and rides around the garden. He rests to comb his hair with a golden comb, and notices the princesses are returning, he barely has time to hide the comb and dismiss the horse, and the youngest princess takes notice of this. Some days later, the princesses send melons to their father as analogy for their marriageability, and the king sends for every available suitor to a selection: the princesses are to release pigeons at random; whoever the birds land on, they shall marry. The youngest's pigeon lands on the gardener's apprentice. She repeats the action twice more, which confirms her choice of a husband. The king marries his three daughters and places the elder two in good palaces, while the young goes to live with the gardener in a donkey stable. Later, the king sends his sons-in-law to hunt some gazelles as game. The boy summons the horse and gathers all gazelles in the forest to his tent. His brothers-in-law come to meet him, whom they don't recognize, and, seeing the animals around him, ask for a piece. The prince agrees, as long as they allow to be branded with slave marks on their feet. Next, war erupts, and the king leads the army to war. The prince rides his loyal horse and, with the help of the divs and the Simurgh, defeats the enemies. When he is hurt, the king bandages his injuries with a handkerchief, then returns to the donkey stables. The war over, the princess recognizes her father's handkerchief on the gardener's hand, then goes to tell her father. The next morning, the prince awakes, summons the horse and orders a large golden palace to be built in front of his father-in-law's. The prince shows up in his true form and reveals the slave marks on his brothers-in-law, thus confirming his story. The king then makes him his successor. According to Zarubin's introduction, the tale was provided by a Balochi student named Ibrahim Mamad-khanov during the period of 1928–1930.

In a text collected from informant Alamdar Samsanian in the Koroshi dialect with the title Šāhay Bač, translated as The King's Son, a king has a wife and son. After she dies, he marries another woman of perfidious character, for she wants to kill the prince and inherit her husband's estate. The prince has a horse that, everytime it foals, it tosses its young to the sea. One day, the prince questions the animal about it, and the horse answers no one can raise its foal, but the prince says he will do it. The horse then advises the prince how to feed the next foal: with the meat of seven goats and the milk of a black goat with no white spot on its body, and the prince raises the foal accordingly. Back to the queen, she puts her plans into motion: first, she puts poison in his food; next, she digs up a hole, fills it with swords and spears and covers it with a carpet, for the prince to fall in when he sits to eat. Each time when the prince comes back from school and goes to meet the foal, it warns him of the danger, thus he escapes. The queen complains to someone about killing the prince, and they suggest she should kill the animal first, for it is the foal that is warning him. Thus, she feigns illness (jaundice) and asks for horse-blood as remedy. The king falls for her trick, and decides to sacrifice his son's pet foal. The prince does not consent to it, so the king decides to kill it while his son is at school. The foal discovers the plan and plots with the prince: it will neigh three times to warn him. The next morning, the horse neighs twice, and the prince throws candies to distract his schoolmates and then throws salt at their eyes to deter them, while he rushes back home. He stops the execution and asks the king for a ride on the foal. The king allows it, and the prince jumps over the soldiers and gallops away. The duo reach a city, the foal gives the prince some of its hairs, while the prince finds a shepherd, trades clothes with him and places a sheep's rumen on his head to appear bald. He goes to work for a gardener as his assistant. The garden belongs to the king, and one day the monarch and his seven daughters come to relax in the garden. The tale then explains the prince rides with his princely garments on the foal, which the seventh princess witnesses. The princess also admires his beauty, and in another occasion spies on his bathing time, taking an interest in him. Some time later, the minister tells the king it is past time to marry the princesses, and they gather all suitable young men, and the princesses shall choose their husbands from the crowd by using an apple. The six elder princesses choose their husbands, but the youngest withholds her apple, for her suitor, Hasan the Bald (hasan ka'čal, in the original text), is not there. The king orders the gardener's assistant to be brought there, and the princess throws her apple to him, hitting her chest. Thinking his daughter made a mistake, the king asks her to repeat the action, and still she chooses Hasan. The king agrees to their marriage, but banises her to live in the desert in their own hut. It happens thus, and Hasan spends the days grazing the king's donkeys and horses. One day, the king orders his six sons-in-law to hunt some prey, and they ride with guns and horses. The youngest princess convinces her husband, Hasan the Bald, to join them. Hasan is then given a lame mount, but, out of sight, he burns his foal's hairs to summon it, asking the animal to neigh and summon every prey in the mountains near them, while he sets up a tent. The foal does as asked, and every animal gathers near him, leaving his brothers-in-law empty-handed. The six brothers-in-law arrive at the prince's tent, whom they do not recognize, and ask for some. The prince makes a deal: he will give some of his game in exchange for them allowing the prince to leave a mark on their shoulders with the animal's blood. As the prince slays the animals and marks the other hunts, he keeps muttering to himself over the carcasses for the taste to be at the head. The deal done, they part ways. The six brothers-in-law bring home tasteless meat, which the princesses use for insipid meals, while the youngest princess cooks a tasty dish of head and trotters. While the youngest princess brings her father her dish, she is mocked by her elder sisters, then goes back to her husband, confiding in him that she knows his identity and requesting he reveals it to end their mockery. The prince then summons his foal once again, and requests a palace to be built greater than the king's. The next morning, when the muezzin goes for the morning call for the prayers, he sights the newly built palace and alerts the king. The king and his ministers visit the palace and meet the bald gardener, who has come after his six servants whose bodies have been branded. The king sends for the slaves, and discovers they are his six sons-in-law and their wives. The gardener then explains he is a prince who married the youngest princess, and their brothers- and sisters-in-law become their servants.

=== Europe ===
==== Bashkir people ====
In a tale from the Bashkirs titled Алтынкойрок - Көмөшъял, translated into Russian language as "Златохвостый-Серебряногривый" ("Golden-Tailed, Silver-Maned"), an old couple live in poverty with their two daughters and a son named Кыдрас (Kydras), until one day they die and leave the siblings orphaned. Kydras finds work as a donkey keeper for a bai and takes the donkey for a bath in the river. He earns some money, but is sacked, and has to look for another job. After going through the forest and scaring away some wolves by setting fire to a haystack, he finally reaches another village, where he finds work as a horse keeper for another bai. The second bai has 34 mares and 6 stallions, but one of the mares, Юндузкашка (Yunduzkashka), sometimes disappears at night to foal somewhere. The bai makes an agreement with Kydras: if the boy can find out where the mare foals, he can get of its colts. During the first three nights, Kydras watches over Yunduzkashka, but on the fourth the boy falls asleep and the mare escapes to the Aral Sea to foal. The next round of nights, Kydras manages to follow the runaway mare to the sea and spies on its foaling in the sea. Kydras manages to rescue a silver-maned, golden-tailed colt and bring it back to the bai. After three years, the colt becomes a fine stallion. However, the bai's wife falls ill and asks for the stallion's ribmeat as cure. Kydras pays a visit to the stallion in the stables to mourn over its potential death, and the horse begins to talk to the boy: since Kydras was the one that groomed and fed it, he can be the one to save it; it will neigh three times near the time of execution to alert him, and Kydras is to beg the bai for one last ride on the horse. After the evening prayers, Kydras follows the horse's plan and both ride away from the village and deep within the forest. At a safe distance, the horse gives Kydras some of its tail hairs, which can summon it if the youth needs its help, and gallops away. Kydras goes to a nearby house where an old couple lives; the old man is to bring apples to the three princesses. Kydras offers to go in his stead and takes the apples to the princesses: a rotten one for the eldest, a semi-rotten for the middle one, and a ripe for the youngest. The king thinks the presents are an outrage and sends for Kydras. The youth goes to the king's presence and explains that the apples represent their marriageability. Moved by the words, the king then sets a suitor selection test: the princesses will stand on a raised platform and throw their apples to their husbands of choice. The elder princess throws her to a soldier, the middle one to an officer, and the youngest to Kydras. Thinking his third daughter made a mistake, the king orders her to toss her apple again, and it still falls on Kydras's lot. Resigned, the king gives his elder daughters ivory palaces, and moves his youngest to an old hut. Later, the king falls ill, and only meat from the rib of a long-lived, 101-years-old owl can cure him. Kydras is given a lame horse to venture through the woods, but he summons the silver-maned, golden-tailed stallion and hunts the owl before his brothers-in-law. He cuts off the owls ribs, and waits for his brother-in-law. The duo see that Kydras got the owl and ask for its carcass; the youth agrees to trade for it, in exchange for Kydras cutting off some slices of flesh from the back of one of them. Kydras gives the wrong rib to the brothers-in-law, but saves the correct one for himself to give to the king. Later, the king needs the rib of another owl, this time from a 107-years-old one. Kydras finds the owl first, and, once again, his brothers-in-law come to the forest and ask for a share. Kydras agrees to the deal, in exchange for branding the back of the other brother-in-law. Later, Kydras tells his wife he will go away for three months. He returns three months later with a new disguise: a fine knight mounted on the silver-maned, golden-tailed stallion. He jumps over the palace gates and meets the king, demanding his two soldiers: one with slices of flesh cut from his back, and the other with the branded back. The king, Kydras's father-in-law, sends for his two sons-in-law to placate the stranger. The third princess comes in and begs for her father. Kydras takes off his disguise and they recognize him. According to folklorist Lev Barag, Kydras's search for the mare Yunduzkashka and the rescue of its foal is "similar" to other Bashkir tales and has "archaic parallels", also appearing in Mongolic (Kalmyk and Mongol) and Turkic traditions (Kazakh, Uzbek, Turkish and Yakut).

== See also ==
- Fire Boy (folktale)
- The Boy with the Moon on his Forehead
- Kaloghlan (Turkish folk hero)
- The Princess on the Glass Hill
- Iron Hans
- The Horse Lurja
- The Turtle Prince (folktale)
- Sang Thong
