= Molla Badji =

Iranian folktale about a calumniated wife

Molla Badji is an Iranian folktale collected and translated by researcher Adrienne Boulvin and published in 1975. It is related to the theme of the calumniated wife and is classified in the international Aarne-Thompson-Uther Index as ATU 707, "The Three Golden Children". These tales refer to stories where a girl promises a king she will bear a child or children with wonderful attributes, but her jealous relatives or the king's other wives plot against the babies and their mother. Variants are collected in Iran and in other Iranian languages and among Iranic peoples.

== Sources ==
Boulvin sourced the tale from Tabas. Ulrich Marzolph traced its source to Khorasan.

== Summary ==
In this tale, a trader has three daughters that go to Quranic school. Their teacher, named Mollâ Bâdji, has a daughter named Fâtme, who appears each day with a new garment. The sisters ask Mollâ Bâdji how Fâtme looks good every day, and the teacher suggests that the girls' mother is neglecting them, so they just have to get rid of her by drowning her in the vinegar jar. The girls follow their teacher's advice. Time passes, and the girls talk to their father about remarrying, and suggest their teacher, Mollâ Bâdji, as his new wife. The wedding is celebrated, and, on the wedding night, Mollâ Bâdji orders her husband to abandon his daughters in the desert, away from the village. The trader is reluctant at first, but agrees to take the girls to the desert under a false pretext of visiting their aunt. They leave the next morning and pass by a garden. The father blindfolds the girls and explains he will gather nuts for them, but has to protect their eyes from the shards that may escape and blind their eyes. The father snaps a tree branch to further the ruse, but flees and leaves the girls there. The three sisters take off their blindfolds and notice their father abandoned them there in the wilderness.

Some time later, the girls begin to feel hungry and plan to eat their cadette. She dissuades them by saying that they may eat her to sate their hunger, but the next day they will still be hungry, so she offers to go out. The third sister manages to find a brick wall and discover an underground path that leads to a palace. She goes back to her sisters and take them to the palace, where they spend the next months. One day, a king and his son are riding along the path, and overhear the three sisters' conversation about marrying a king: the elder sister promises to weave a carpet so large to accommodate the dignitaries of the whole kingdom, and half will still be unseated; the middle sister that with only an eggshell she can cook a dish to feed the whole army, and there would still be food left; and the cadette promises to bear the king twins, a girl with golden hair and a boy with teeth of pearl.

The king and his son decide to summon the girls to their presence, and announce that the prince shall marry the elder sister, and she has to prove her claim. The elder fails to weave their carpet, and is thrown in prison. The king's son marries the second sister and orders her to prepare the food. The middle sister also fails and is thrown in prison. He finally marries the third sister and threatens to kill her if she cannot fulfill her promise. However, by the end of nine months, she gives birth to twins: a daughter with golden hair and a son with teeth of pearl. The elder sisters, jealous of the youngest success, bribe an old matchmaker to get the twins and cast them in the water in a box, and put two puppies in their place. The matchmaker follows the deadly plan; the king's son orders his wife to be cast in prison and buried in hot sand.

As for the twins, the box washes ashore on a beach near a hermitage. A hermit finds the twins and a gazelle suckles them, thinking them to be its young. The gazelle nurses the babies and the hermit names the boy Mohammed and the girl Zari. After seven years, on his deathbed, the hermit predicts that a white horse will come out of the sea to help them, and they must never part with it. The white horse appears, and they ride it to the land of their parents. The twins build a large house for them and live here for years. Their aunts notice the twins are their nephews, and send the matchmaker to pay them a visit. The matchmaker compliments their home, but tells Zari about the tree of laughing flowers. Zari tells her brother Mohammed that she wants it for their garden.

Mohammed and the white horse go to the garden of fairies to find the tree and bring it home. Next, the matchmaker tells Zari about the marvellous robe, which is also found by the male twin. Lastly, the matchmaker sends them after the daughter of the king of the fairies. Mohammed rides the horse to the palace of the fairy king, steals the princess and takes her with him. Mohammed marries the fairy princess and she reveals the truth of their origin.

The king invites the twins and the fairy princess for a banquet at the palace. During the dinner, a magpie perches near the tablecloth. The twins interact with the magpie. The king is surprised by their behaviour and asks if the bird can understand them, to which the fairy princess asks if a woman can bear animals. The king realizes the twins are their children, takes off his wife from her cell, and punishes his sisters-in-law.

== Analysis ==
=== Tale type ===
The tale is classified in the international Aarne-Thompson-Uther Index as type ATU 707, "The Three Golden Children": three sisters converse among themselves about their plans to marry the king, the youngest promising to bear children with wondrous aspect; the king decides to marry the youngest (or all three), and the youngest bears the wondrous children, who are taken from her and cast in the water by the jealous aunts; years later, the children, after many adventures, reunite the family, which leads to the aunts being punished.

German scholar Ulrich Marzolph, in his catalogue of Persian folktales, listed 10 variants of the tale type across Persian sources, which he indexed as Die gerechtfertigte verleumdete Frau ("The calumniated girl is vindicated").

==== The initial sequence ====
Both Boulvin and Marzolph also classify the tale as type ATU 480, for its initial sequence: father remarries and, on his new wife's orders, abandons his three daughters somewhere in the wilderness.

This initial sequence also occurs as an alternate opening of type ATU 707 in Armenia, as a second and "common" opening, according to researcher Suzanna A. Gullakian, and in Georgia, as its own tale type of the Georgian Folktale Index, indexed as -480G*, "Stepmother and Stepdaughter".

=== Motifs ===
The Iranian-language tales vary between the quest for the usual three treasures (a magical water, a magical tree and a type of bird) and the Fairy Maiden who reveals the truth at the end of the tale.

According to the type's description in Marzolph's index, in the Persian variants the third sister promises to bear the king a boy with golden hair, although in some tales she may also give birth to a twin sister.

== Variants ==
=== Iran ===
==== The Story of the Jealous Sisters ====
In a variant titled The Story of the Jealous Sisters, collected by Emily Lorimer and David Lockhart Robertson Lorimer, from Kermani, a father abandons his three daughters in the woods. A prince finds them and marries the youngest sister. After she becomes his wife, she gives birth to twins: "a son with a tuft of golden hair and a daughter with a face as beautiful as the moon". Her jealous sisters throw them in the stream. The prince condemns his wife to be trapped in a lime pillar and for stones to be thrown at her. Years later, when the brother passes by her, the youth throws a rose leaf at her, which prompts the king to summon his sisters-in-law.

==== Mehrab Chah and the Three Sisters ====
Boulvin collected another tale from Torbat-e Heydarieh which she translated as Mehrab Chah et Les Trois Soeurs ("Mehrab Chah and the Three Sisters"). In this tale, a king and a son spy on three sisters talking about their grandiose boasts: the elder boasts she can weave a carpet large enough to accommodate the dignitaries in only half of it; the middle one that she can cook with a single eggshell food for the whole army, and the youngest promises to bear twins, a girl with golden hair and a boy with pearl of teeth. The prince marries the three sisters and bids them fulfill their claims: the elder fails due to prickling the carpet with needles, and the middle one fails for cooking inedible food. The youngest gives birth to her promised twins, who are taken from her and cast in the sea. A hermit finds the box with the twins and gives them to be nursed by a gazelle. A white horse from the sea also gives its aid to the children. Years later, they move out to the city, and the boy is sent for the tree of laughing flowers, a magical robe and a fairy woman. He takes the fairy woman with him to live with his sister and marries the fairy woman. At the end of the tale, the fairy woman reveals the truth to the prince, her father-in-law.

==== The Shah and the Seven Women ====
In a variant from Bushehr Province, published in 2003 with the title شاه و هفت زن (English: "The Shah and the Seven Women"), a childless king hasn't fathered a son, despite being married to six co-wives. During a hunt, he sights a beautiful peasant maiden and asks her father for her hand in marriage. She becomes the seventh queen and gives birth to a boy and a girl. The other six wives, jealous of her, bribe the midwife to get rid of the babies in a wooden box and to replace them for puppies. The wooden box with the twins is cast in the sea, but they are rescued by an old woman. Years later, they move out of the old woman's house to another home in the woods, where the king sees them. He tells the other queens about the encounter and the six women, fearing the king might discover the truth, send the midwife to convince the twins to seek Manni Chen (a magical harp that sings) and a shining scarf from the ghouls.

==== The Golden-Haired Son and the Pearly-Toothed Daughter ====
In an Iranian tale titled "پسر کاکل‌زری و دختر دندون‌مروارید" ("The Golden-Haired Son and the Pearly-Toothed Daughter"), three sisters live in poverty. One night, the prince eavesdrops on their conversation: the eldest boasts that she can sew clothes for the army with three spools of thread, the middle one that she can cook meals for the whole army with a pot, and the youngest promises to bear twins, a boy with golden hair and a girl with teeth of pearl. Later, the prince orders the girls to be brought to their presence: the elder cannot sew clothes with three spools and the middle one cooks her meal with too much salt that it becomes inedible. However, after nine months, the third sister gives birth to her promised twins, to the jealousy of the elder ones. Thus, the pair conspires with a midwife to cast the children in the water in a box and replace them for puppies. The prince falls for their trick and orders his wife's execution, but a minister, out of mercy, sequesters her in his own house. As for the children, a man at a well finds the children and takes them home to raise them. Years later, their adoptive father dies, but gives them a piece of advice: do not let people in and do not eat anything they offer. Some time later, the midwife passes by the twins' house and goes to warn the fallen queen's sisters, who devise a plan: the midwife pays a visit to the female twin on the pretext of bringing her food. The female twin lets the midwife in after gaining her brother's permission, and while she is distracted, the midwife puts some poison in the food, then leaves. A little animal eats the poisoned food and dies, alerting the twins. The sisters' next plan is put into motion: the newest wife of the prince, who has become a king and remarried, feigns illness, and the midwife tells the king that a youth can find her the laughing apple and the crying pomegranate as the cure. The king sends for the golden-haired male twin and commands him to bring back the fruits. With the aid of a dervish, the golden-haired twin enters a garden and escapes as quickly as he can before he is petrified. Lastly, the queen feigns illness again and demands the meat of a Chinese bird. Once again, the male twin is sent for the bird: with the help of a dev, who sends his seven sons to a well, the youth calls for the bird, and the animal perches on his shoulder. The youth brings the bird home and he notices it is not eating his seeds. The golden-haired youth questions the bird about it, and the bird replies for the boy to sit at his father's, the king, lap. The king takes off the youth's headwear and notices his golden hair, and sends for the female twin, deducing she is the pearly-toothed girl his wife promised. The female twin is brought to the king's presence, which confirms the whole story. The king then orders the execution of his sisters-in-law and the midwife. The minister intervenes and brings back the disgraced queen to the palace, reuniting the family after years.

=== Tajikistan ===
In a Tajik tale titled "Говорящие попугаи" ("Talking Parrot"), translated to Hungarian as A beszélö pagagáj ("The Talking Parrot") and to English as The Talking Parrots, the padishah suffers for he has no child, despite having three wives, so he orders his wazir to look for a fourth wife for him. The wazir rides high and low, until he finds a shepherd's three daughters talking near the river: the elder sister boasts she can cook a cauldron of pilaf to feed the entire kingdom, the middle one that she can weave a carpet to cover the entire world and, if rolled, it would be the size of a pistachio nut, and the youngest promises to give birth to a boy and a girl with hair bright like fire, faces bright as the sun and with a beauty mark on their brow. The wazir brings the third sisters to the padishah, who takes her as his fourth wife. While he is away, the third sister gives birth to her promised children. The other three co-wives, on seeing the children's beauty, decide to get rid of the twins, and bribe an old nurse to dispose of the children. The old nurse, however, takes them to a shepherd to raise. Years later, they are sent on a quest for a magical mirror that can see the whole world and a talking parrot (or parrots, in another translation). On the second quest, the male twin listens to the parrots' conversation who curse him to become stone. His sister notices his long absence, dons male clothes and goes after him. She meets an old woman on the road who advises her to climb the crystal mountain and stay at a certain distance from the garden where the parrots are, and shout her brother's name. The female twin does as instructed and brings her brother and the other status to life, then both siblings return home with the parrots. The padishah invites the shepherd and his adopted children are ready to attend it, when the parrots begins to talk in front of the mirror: it shows the padishah's first three wives putting poison in every dish and on the carpets. The shepherd and the twins go the palace and avoid walking on the carpets, then join the padishah's guests. The padishah spots the female twin and falls in love with her, announcing he plans to marry her. However, the shepherd reveals the secret that the twins are the padishah's children, and the monarch calls for the three traitorous wives, who admit their guilt.

Russian linguist I. M. Oranksij collected a variant in the Parya language from kolhoznik Ašur Kamolov in 1961, in Hissar district. In his tale, a padishah with two wives goes in search of a third one. He meets three women talking: the daughter of the vizir, the daughter of the bey and the daughter of the shepherd. The daughter of the shepherd says that she will bear a boy and a girl "as have never existed in the (whole) world". They marry. After the birth of the twins, they are replaced by the other co-wives by puppies and abandoned in the steppes, but a gazelle nurses the babies. Years later, they are sent for a talking nightingale.

In a tale collected in Dushanbe and translated into Russian as "Непризнанный царевич" ("The Unidentified Prince"), a poor old man that gathers brushwood lives with a wife and son. One day, he catches a large fish and finds a golden ring inside which he sells for a large sum of money. Some time later, he finds a large box in the river, with a woman and a beautiful baby inside. The old man takes them in. The tale then flashbacks to explains that the woman in the box was one of the wives of a local king, whose other co-wives tried to get rid of by bribing some servants to kill her. The servants did spare her, but cast her and her baby in the river. Back to present time, the woman's boy grows up a fine youth and decides to find work in the royal palace. His mother also goes with him and works there serving tea. Due to her beauty, the king falls in love with her and marries - unaware she was one of his previous wives. The co-queens, threatened by the boy's presence in court, try to get rid of him by sending him after some miraculous objects: first, after the "Каменную Воду" ("Stone Water"); then, for the "Разноцветную Воду" ("the multicoloured water"), and lastly for the "Вьющееся Дерево" ("the twisting tree"). With the help of a peri, the boy flies to Mount Kof and obtains the items. At the end of the tale, the boy's mother reveals to the king the boy is his own son, and that she was slandered by the co-wives. The king orders the co-queens' execution and reinstates the fallen queen to his side.

=== Yaghnobi people ===
In an untitled tale in the Yaghnobi language published by Russian orientalists Mikhail Stepanovich Andreev and Elena Mikhailovna Peshchereva, a king and his wife are childless. One day, he goes on a hunt and meets three sisters; the middle one tells the king to marry her, for she will bear a smart child to him. Their marriage is arranged, and eventually the second wife becomes pregnant. After nine months, while the king is away, the co-wife's "pinonch" assists her labour, and she gives birth to a pair of twins, a boy and a girl. The midwife is bribed to abandon the children in the desert and replace them for puppies. After the king comes back, he is told his second wife gave birth to animals, and he orders her to be left in a desert with them. As for the children, they are nursed by a she-goat and found by an old thorn-gatherer, who raises them. Years later, when the girl is of marriageable age, the king passes by the old man's house and meets the girl. The king then arranges with the vizier his marriage to the female twin, who invites her male twin to the wedding feast. However, the female twin instructs her twin to create a ruckus during the meal, dropping the king's spoon on the table and eating from his plate, so the king will feel insulted and demand an explanation for this insolence, to which he is to answer that what law allows a father to marry his daughter, for the twins are the king's children. On the appointed day, the guests are served and the male twin goes through with the plan. The king complains about the youth's behaviour, and the male twin reveals the truth to him. The king rejoices for having found his lost children, and rescues his wife from the wilderness. The queen is restored to her place, while the other co-wife is punished by being tied to three horses.

=== Pamir Mountains ===
In a tale from the Pamir Mountains titled "Три сестры" ("Three Sisters"), from the collection of Ivan Zarubin, the royal vizier overhears the three sisters' talk while they are getting water, the youngest promising to bear a golden-haired boy and a beautiful girl if she marries the king. The vizir reports his findings to the king and he marries the third sister. When the twins are born, they are replaced by two puppies, but are found by the gardener. Years later, they are sent after a dress made by the claws of a fox, a magic mirror that can see the whole world and the talking parrot. The parrot stops an accidental marriage between the king and his daughter, and the gardener tells the twins the truth of their adoption in a banquet with the monarch.

=== Kurdish people ===
A similar story also exists in the folktale corpus of the Kurdish people. According to the Catalogue of Kurdish Folktales, in tale type 707, "Die Wünsche der drei Schwestern" ("The Wishes of Three Sisters"), a king overhears the conversation of three sisters about their skills: the elder promising to weave a carpet to hold the entire army, the middle one to cook a single egg to feed the whole army, and the third promising to bear twins, a golden-haired boy who can produce flowers from his mouth with his smile and a girl with silver hair and able to produce pearls with her tears. The king marries all three, but only the third sister fulfills her promise, to the elder sisters' envy, who abandon the children in a box in the water to die; the twins are rescued by a miller and raised to youth, when the elder sisters send them on dangerous quests. At the end of the tale, the twins are invited to a meal with the king, and twins give him two wooden doves for him to eat; the king questions the idea, and is questioned about the possibility of a woman giving birth to two puppies. The tale type registers 22 variants across Kurdish sources.

In a Kurdish tale published by Kurdologist Margarita Rudenko with the title "Мирза-Мамуд и Хезаран-Больболь" ("Mirza-Mamud and Khezaran-Bolbol"), the padishah marries three sisters, the youngest promising to give birth to golden-haired twins, a boy and a girl. Her envious sisters replace the children for animals and cast them in the sea in a box. The box is rescued by a miller, who saves the twins and names them Mirza-Mamud (the boy) and Golizar (the girl). Years later, they move to a new house and the boy meets his father, the Padishah, in a deer hunt. The queen's sisters despair and send an old woman to convince Golizar and Mirza-Mamud to go on a dangerous quest for a maiden named Зардухубар (Zardukhubar). Mirza-Mamud rescues Zardukhubar and they escape from an ogress (tale type ATU 313H*, connected to The Magical Flight or The Devil's Daughter). Zardukhubar becomes Golizar's house companion. Later, the old woman tells the siblings about a magical bird named Khezaran-Bolbol. Mirza-Mamud fails the quest and is petrified. Noticing his long absence, Golizar and Zardukhubar seek him out. They meet an old hermit on the way who tells them how to safely capture the bird. Both women rescue the youth and a whole garden of petrified people. On their way back, the hermit asks them for a prayer, which the trio do and disenchant him into a handsome young man. The quartet is invited to a feast with the king, but the bird warns them their food is poisoned. As instructed by the bird, the siblings invite their father, the padishah, to their house, where the whole truth is revealed.

Kurdologists Ordîxanê Jalîl, Celîlê Celîl and Zine Jalil collected another Kurdish tale in 1976 from informant Osei Shababa. In this tale, titled "Златокудрые" ("Golden-Curls"), a padishah forbids lighting up a source of light in any house at night, but one house's residents break the prohibition. The padishah and his vizir visit the house and overhear the conversation of three spinning sisters: the eldest promises to make a grand meal for the padishah if he takes her for wife; the middle one promises to weave a unique and singular carpet and the youngest promises to bear him a boy and a girl with golden curls. The padishah marries the youngest and goes to war; a witch takes the children, replaces them for puppies and casts them in a box in the sea. The box with the children washes ashore; a deer sees the twins and nurses them. Years later, the boy, named Hussein, and the girl, named Gulizar, build a house for them and make garments made of gazelle skin. One day, the padishah hunts some gazelles and is led to the twins' house. He admires the boy's golden curls and imagines what his son could have been. Realizing the twins are their nephews, the padishah's sisters-in-law send the witch to the twins' house. The witch passes herself as a devotee on a hajj and convinces them to seek, first, after a magical tablecloth that produces food with a magical wand, and, later, for a maiden named Шарихубар (Sharikhubar). When Hussein goes for her, her powers petrify him, so his sister Gulizar is the one to rescue him and get Sharikhubar back home. At last, Sharikhubar helps them reveal the truth of their origin.

Researcher Sara Belelli collected and published a Kurdish variant in the Laki language from Kermanshah, with the title Mā(h) pīšānī ("Moon-forehead") (tale types ATU 480 and ATU 707): a girl meets by the riverbank an old ugly woman and compliments her head. When the river water becomes yellow, the old woman throws the girl in the river and she comes out with a moon and a star on her forehead. When the girl's stepsister meets the old woman, she insult her and becomes ugly. The tale then focuses on a prince, who meets Māh pīšānī and her two elder sisters: the elder promises to cook a man of rice to feed 500 people; the middle one that she can weave a carpet large enough for a thousand people, and Māh pīšānī promises to bear him a boy who can cry tears of pearl and a girl whose laughter produces flowers.

== See also ==
- The Children with the Golden Locks
