= Elizabeth Lambourn =

British historian and academic (born 1966)

Elizabeth Anne Lambourn, FBA (born 6 July 1966) is a British historian and academic, specialising in medieval history, the Indian Ocean, material culture and cross-cultural studies. Since 2021, she has been Professor of Material Histories at De Montfort University; she had joined the university in 2002 as a postdoctoral research fellow.

She studied art history at the University of Edinburgh, graduating with an undergraduate Master of Arts (MA Hons) degree in 1988. She later undertook a Doctor of Philosophy (PhD) degree in art and archaeology at SOAS University of London. She graduated in 1999, with a doctoral thesis titled "'A collection of merits gathered from different sources': the Islamic marble carving and architecture of Cambay in Gujarat between 1200 and 1350 AD."

In the Fall of 2022, Lambourn was a Fellow at the Swedish Collegium for Advanced Study in Uppsala, Sweden. In July 2023, she was elected Fellow of the British Academy (FBA), the United Kingdom's national academy for the humanities and social sciences.

== Selected works ==
- Lambourn, Elizabeth A. (2010). "A Self-Conscious Art? Seeing Micro-Architecture in Sultanate South Asia". Muqarnas. 27: 121–156. ISSN 0732-2992.
- Lambourn, Elizabeth (2017). Legal encounters on the medieval globe. Kalamazoo: Arc Humanities Press. ISBN 9781942401117.
- Lambourn, Elizabeth (2018). Abraham's luggage: a social life of things in the medieval Indian ocean world. Cambridge: Cambridge University Press. ISBN 9781316795453.
- Lambourn, Elizabeth, ed. (2021). A Cultural History of the Sea in the Medieval Age. The Cultural Histories Series. London: Bloomsbury Academic. ISBN 9781474299022.
