= Takamchi =

Takam-Chi (Azerbaijani: تکم چی), or Takam Gardān (meaning, the one who turns around the Takam), is the person who plays the Takam. Both Takam and Takam-Chi are Turkic-Azari words.

Takam-Chi is also the name of a recent Iranian motion picture (2008), directed by Yadollah Samadi. The dialogues of this film are partly in Azerbaijani and partly in Persian.
