= Takam =

Takam (Azerbaijani: تکم for "my billy goat") is the name of the King of the Goats, a character featuring in the folk mythology of Azarbaijan, Iran. Takam effigies - a type of simple rod puppet - are carved from wood and ornamented with coloured glass beads and chicken feathers from the tail of a cock. A pole affixed to the Takam is passed through a hole in a plank which is held horizontally, from below which the Takam is moved about to create the illusion that ‘he’ is dancing on the surface of the plank. While operating this traditional puppet, the person portraying the Takam (who is referred to as Takam-Chi (تکم چی), or Takam Gardān, meaning, ‘the one who manipulates the Takam’), chants special poetry which is called Sāyā (سایا). The tradition of playing the Takam is millennia-old and invariably in all Sāyās reference is made to the natural landscapes, pastures and domestic animals of Azerbaijan. At present, the tradition of playing the Takam is strongest in Ardebil. Takams were originally played as messengers bearing the glad tidings of the arrival of the Spring. In modern times, Takams are also played in connection with a variety of other special festive events. It is conceivable that Takam and Pan, the Greek god of shepherds and flocks, may have a common historical origin.

== See also ==
- Puck Fair
