= Rip Van Winkle (disambiguation) =

"Rip Van Winkle" is a short story by American author Washington Irving, published in 1819.

Rip Van Winkle may also refer to:

== Art, entertainment, and media ==
=== Films ===
- Rip Van Winkle (1903 film), American short black-and-white silent compilation film
- Rip Van Winkle (1910 film), lost film by the Thanhouser Company
- Rip Van Winkle (1912 film), Australian feature-length film
- Rip Van Winkle (1914 film), film with cinematography by Sol Polito
- Rip Van Winkle (1921 film), directed by Ward Lascelle
- Rip Van Winkle (1978 film), directed by Will Vinton

=== Music ===
- "Rip Van Winkle", a song by the Doo-Wop Rock 'n Roll trio Shannon and the Clams on their first LP, Dreams in the Rat House
- "Rip Van Winkle", a single by The Devotions released in 1961, 1962, and 1964
- "Rip Van Winkle", song by the American stoner/doom metal band Witch on their 2006 debut record Witch

=== Other art, entertainment, and media ===
- Rip Van Winkle (operetta), an operetta in three acts by Robert Planquette
- Rip Van Winkle, a tone poem by Ferde Grofé
- Rip van Winkle, manga character, see list of Hellsing characters
- A Bride for Rip Van Winkle, a novel by Shunji Iwai

== Other uses ==
- Rip Van Winkle (horse) (2006–2020), a Thoroughbred racehorse
- MV Rip Van Winkle, a Hudson River tour boat based in Kingston, New York
- Rip van Winkle cipher, a provably secure cipher
- Rip Van Winkle Bridge, a cantilever bridge spanning the Hudson River between Hudson and Catskill, New York
- Rip Van Winkle, a bus company, a predecessor to Trailways of New York
- Old Rip Van Winkle bourbon whiskey
