= The Dream of a Summer Day =

"The Dream of a Summer Day" is an essay by Lafcadio Hearn that reminisced on his childhood, and which also incorporated a retelling of the Japanese folktale of Urashima Tarō. It was the first piece in the collection Out of the East (1895).

== Essay ==
"The Dream of a Summer Day" was first printed in the 28 July 1894 issue of The Japan Weekly Mail, and republished in the collection Out of the East (1895).

=== Urashima and Irish legend ===
Commentators have noted a parallel between the underlying Japanese fairy tale of Urashima Tarō and the Irish legend around Oisín and the fairy princess of the sea, (Note: And the Dragon Palace (Ryūgū in Japanese) parallels the Irish legendary Land of Youth (Tír na nÓg).) and Hearn might have recalled this legend in writing the piece, even though he does not explicitly state this.

Hearn himself considered the Urashima to be similar to Washington Irving's "The Adelantado of the Seven Cities" which deals with a search for St. Brendan's fabled isle, more so than to "Rip van Winkle".

Hearn's biographer Paul Murray has identified it as an "enchanted memory" of his beloved aunt, Catherine Frances Elwood, the elder sister of his Irish father, even though other commentators have assumed it was about his parting with his Greek mother, née Rosa Antonia Cassimati. (Note: Rosa Antonia Cassimati on authority of Murray. Kawamura's paper refers to her as "Rosa Cerigote".)

=== Hearn and the Manyo poem of Urashima ===
Although most commentators stress Hearn's identification with the Urashima figure, Hearn may have also empathized with the ancient poet of the Man'yōshū who recounted the even older legend of Urashima. For Hearn's essay begins in the same way: he starts by describing the scenery of Misumi, Kumamoto where he was then staying, and drifts into the tale of Urashima; likewise, the ancient poet opens by describing the scenery of Suminoe (Suminoe-ku, Osaka), then launches into his musings about the Urashima legend. Hearn's Misumi was not anywhere near the spot of the legend, however, he happened to be staying at an inn named "Urashima-ya". The identity of the ancient poet was unknown to Hearn, but scholars have determined the author of this poem have been Takahashi no Mushimaro.
