= Urashima Tarō =

Protagonist of a Japanese fairy tale

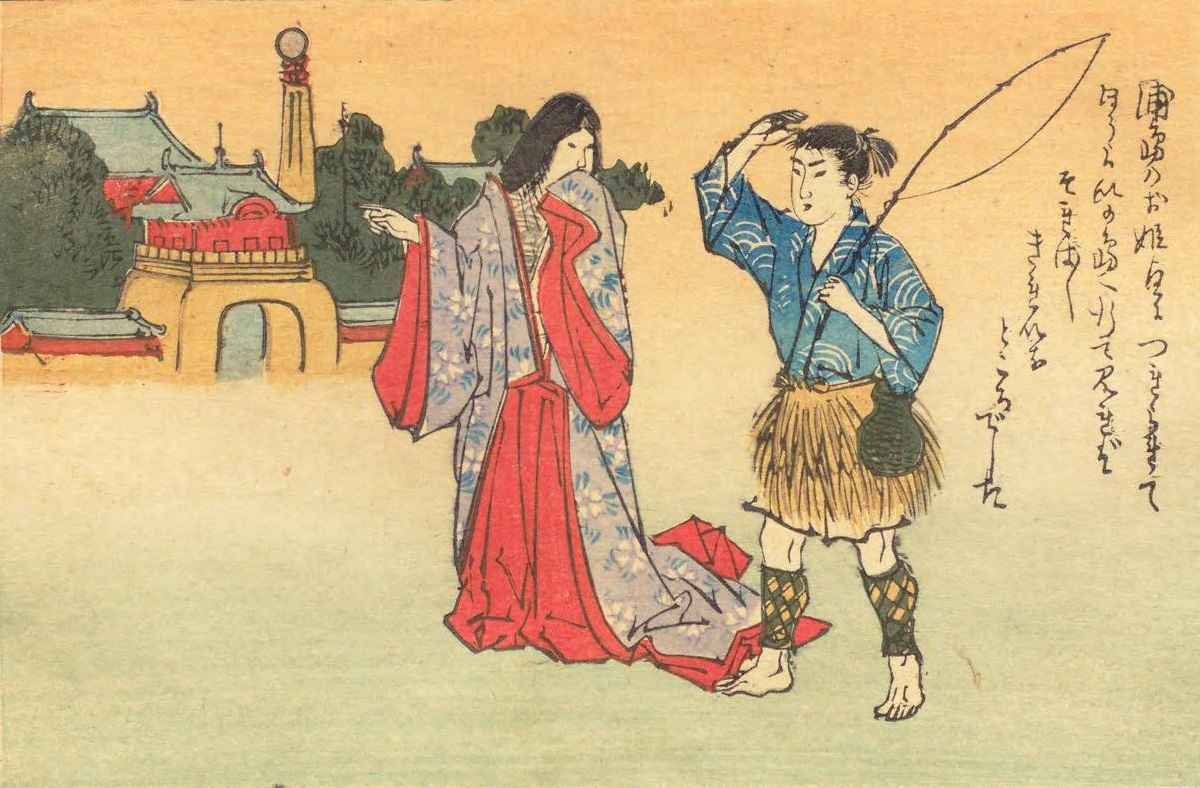
Urashima Tarō and princess of Horai, by Matsuki Heikichi (1899)

Urashima Tarō (浦島 太郎) is the protagonist of a Japanese fairy tale (otogi banashi), who, in a typical modern version, is a fisherman rewarded for rescuing a sea turtle, and carried on its back to the Dragon Palace (Ryūgū-jō) beneath the sea. There, he is entertained by the princess Otohime (Note: Oto-hime must have been the second daughter or the younger princess, since her name Oto can be read as otsu, meaning "No. 2", as in the common phrase kōotsu which means "No. 1 and No. 2"," as explained by folklorist Yoshio Miyao.) as a reward. He spends what he believes to be several days with the princess. But when he returns to his home village, he discovers he has been gone for at least 100 years. When he opens the forbidden jewelled box (tamatebako), given to him by Otohime on his departure, he turns into an old man.

The tale originates from the legend of Urashimako (Urashima no ko or Ura no Shimako (Note: Urashimako is the neutral designation; the name was often read as Urashima no ko in the past, but more recent commentators and editions in print prefer Ura no Shimako.)) recorded in various pieces of literature dating to the 8th century, such as the Fudoki for Tango Province, Nihon Shoki, and the Man'yōshū.

During the Muromachi to Edo periods, versions of Urashima Tarō appeared in storybook form called the Otogizōshi, made into finely painted picture scrolls and picture books or mass-printed copies. These texts vary considerably, and in some, the story ends with Urashima Tarō transforming into a crane.

Some iconic elements in the modern version are relatively recent. The portrayal of him riding a turtle dates only to the early 18th century, and while he is carried underwater to the Dragon Palace in modern tellings, he rides a boat to the princess's world; a place called Hōrai in older versions.

== Folktale or fairy tale ==
The Urashima Tarō tale familiar to most Japanese follows the storyline of children's tale author Iwaya Sazanami in the Meiji period. A condensed version of Sazanami's retelling then appeared in Kokutei kyōkasho, Japan's nationally designated textbook for elementary school, and became widely read by schoolchildren of the populace. (Note: Holmes, p. 6: "Miura solves the question of who the author of this Urashima Tarō [textbook] version was, and identifies him as Iwaya Sazanami".) Modern versions of Urashima Tarō, which are generally similar, are demonstrably based on the story from this nationally designated textbook series. (Note: The Urashima tale first appeared in the 2nd edition Kokugo tokuhon or "National Language Reader", officially called Dai-2 ki Jinjō shōgaku tokuhon 第2期尋常小学読本 and unofficially known by the shorthand hatatako tokuhon ハタタコ読本. The story bore the title Urashima no hanashi (ウラシマノハナシ).)

== Plot ==
A young fisherman, Urashima Tarō, is fishing when he notices a group of children torturing a small turtle. Tarō saves it and releases it back to the sea. The next day, a huge turtle approaches him and explains that the small turtle that was saved is the daughter of the Emperor of the Sea, Ryūjin, who wants to meet and thank the fisherman.

The turtle magically gives Tarō gills and brings him to the bottom of the sea, to the Palace of the Dragon God (Ryūgū-jō). There, he meets the Emperor and the small turtle, who is now a lovely princess, Otohime. The palace has a view to the four seasons, one on each side. Tarō stays there with Otohime for three days, but he wants to return to his village and see his aging mother, so he requests permission to leave. The princess says that she is sorry to see him go, but she wishes him well and gives him a mysterious box, tamatebako, which will protect him from harm, but which he must never open. Tarō grabs the box, jumps on the back of the same turtle that had brought him there, and soon is at the seashore.

When he returns to his village, everything has changed. His home is gone, his mother has vanished, and the people whom he knew are nowhere to be found. He asks whether anyone knows a man called Urashima Tarō. They answer that they had heard someone of that name had vanished at sea long ago. He discovers that 300 years have passed since went to the undersea kingdom. Struck by grief, he absentmindedly opens the box. A cloud of white smoke bursts forth. He is suddenly aged, his beard long and white, and his back bent. From the sea comes the sad, sweet voice of the princess: "I told you not to open that box. In it was your old age ...".

== Commonly known version ==
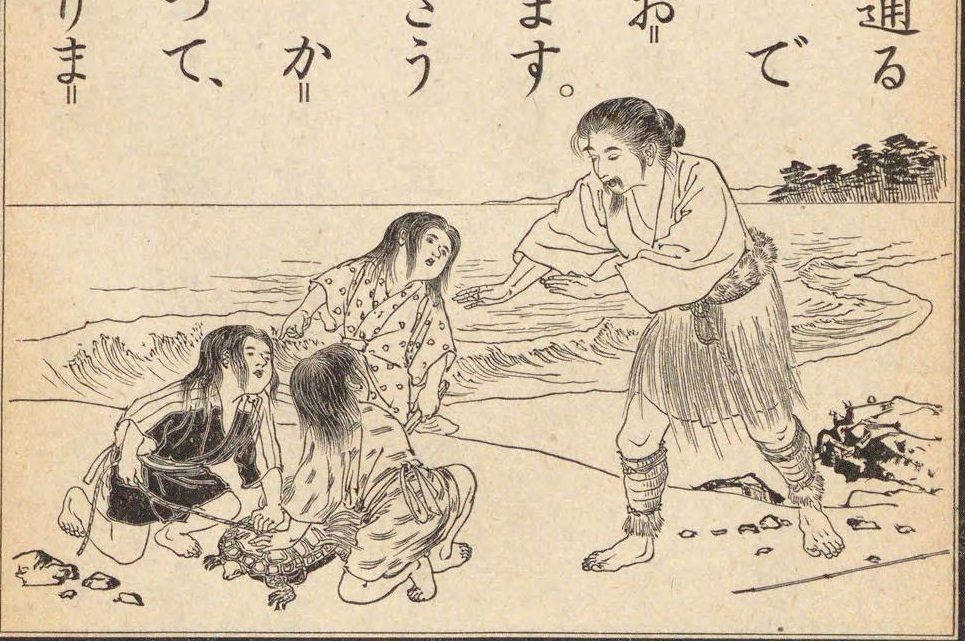
Urashima Taro encounters children on the beach who are "toying with" a turtle. ―Jinjō shōgaku kokugo tokuhon (the 3rd edition of Kokutei tokuhon) (1928)

A summary of the Urashima tale from one of the nationalized textbooks (Kokutei kyōkasho) will be given below. The base text used will be Urashima Tarō (うらしま太郎), from the 3rd edition of the Kokugo tokuhon or "national language reader", a widely familiar textbook used during the 1918–1932 period. (Note: The 3rd edition was officially titled Jinjō shōgaku kokugo tokuhon (尋常小学国語読本) or "Elementary School National Language Reader". It was also known by its nickname Hanahato tokuhon and other known as the "White Reader".) An English translation has been provided in Yoshiko Holmes's thesis. (Note: The title is mixed hiragana and kanji in the 3rd edition. In the 2nd edition it was entirely in katakana. Although the story in the 2nd edition was earlier, Miura's analysis concentrated on the 3rd edition, as it was more widely read.)

Long ago, a man named Urashima Tarō of unidentified profession (Note: The 3rd edition national textbook begins "むかし、うらしま太郎といふ人 (Long ago, a person named Urashima Tarō)".) (or, in recent textbooks often a fisherman) found a turtle on the beach being toyed with by a group of children. He purchased the turtle and released it in the ocean.

Two or three days later, while he was fishing on a boat as always, the grateful turtle came and told him he would carry him on his back to the underwater Dragon Palace (Ryūgū). At the palace, the princess (Otohime) thanked him for saving the turtle. (Note: The 4th phase textbook adds that he was entertained by dances performed by tai (snapper), hirame (halibut), octopuses and other creatures. The tai and hirame fish feature in the school song.)

After an unspecified number of days, remembrance of his mother and father made him homesick, and he bid farewell to Otohime. The princess tried to dissuade him from leaving, but finally let him go with a parting gift, a mysterious box called tamatebako whose lid he was told never to open.

When Tarō returned to his hometown, everything had changed. His home was gone, his mother and father had perished, and the people he knew were nowhere to be seen. After not remembering the princess's warning, he lifted the lid of the box. A cloud of white smoke arose, turning him to a white-haired old man.

The story remained as one of the dozen tales included in the 4th edition of national language reader textbooks also known as Sakura tokuhon used from 1933 to c. 1940, thus continuing to enjoy wide recognition; for this reason Urashima could be considered one of the core stories of the so-called Japanese "national fairy tales".

== School song ==
A number of renditions exist, where they are set to music. Among the most popular is the school song "Urashima Tarō" (浦島太郎) of 1911 which begins with the line "Mukashi, mukashi Urashima wa, tasuketa kame ni tsurerarete (Long long ago was Urashima, by the turtle he rescued taken to the sea)", printed in the Jinjō shōgaku shōka (1911). This song's author was long relegated to anonymity, but the lyricist is now considered to be Okkotsu Saburō.

Another school song "Urashima Tarō" (うらしまたろう, lyrics by Ishihara Wasaburō and music by Tamura Torazō) appeared in the Yōnen shōka (1900). Although written in stilted classical language, Miura considered this version the more familiar.

== Otogizōshi ==
Long before the versions in 19th century textbooks, there had been the otogi-zōshi versions from the Muromachi period. Conventionally, commentators using the term otogizōshi are referring by default to the text found in the Otogi Bunko (or "Companion Library"), since it was printed and widely disseminated. (Note: The Otogi Bunko usually refers to the Shibukawa Collection, c. 1720, but the color-illustrated book called tanroku-bon dated 50 years earlier carries the same text.)

=== Otogi Bunko ===
In the Otogi Bunko (or "Companion Library") version, a young fisherman named Urashima Tarō catches a turtle on his fishing line and releases it. The next day, Urashima encounters a boat with a woman on it wishing to be escorted home. She does not identify herself, although she is the transformation of the turtle that was spared. (Note: She only reveals this when Urashima wants to leave the Dragon Palace.) When Urashima rows her boat to her magnificent residence, she proposes that they marry. The residence is the Dragon Palace, and on the four sides of the palace, each gardenscape is in a different season. Urashima decides to return to his home after three years and is given a memento box (かたみの筥/箱, katami no hako) in parting. (Note: However the box is called tamatebako in the Otogi Bunko version, not in the main text, but in the inserted poem that contains the expression "akete kuyashiki" which later led to the stock phrase "opened to his regret(mortification), the tamatebako (開けて悔しき玉手箱, akete kuyashiki tamatebako)" which has become well-known in association with the Urashima tale. This poem is quoted not just in the Otogi Bunko and all the Group IV texts, but in Group I also.) He arrives in his hometown to find it desolate, and discovers 700 years have passed since he last left it. He cannot restrain his temptation to open the box which he was cautioned not to open, whereupon three wisps of purple cloud appear and turn him into an old man. It ends with Urashima Tarō transforming into a crane, and his wife reverting to the form of a turtle, the two thereafter revered as myōjin (Shinto deities).

=== Variants and groups ===
There are over 50 texts of the Urashima Tarō otogi-zōshi extant. These variants fall into four broad groups, clustered by their similarity. The Otogi Bunko text belongs to Group IV. (Note: Also both the picture scroll and the storybook in the Columbia University Library collection are Group IV.)

=== Group closest to modern version ===
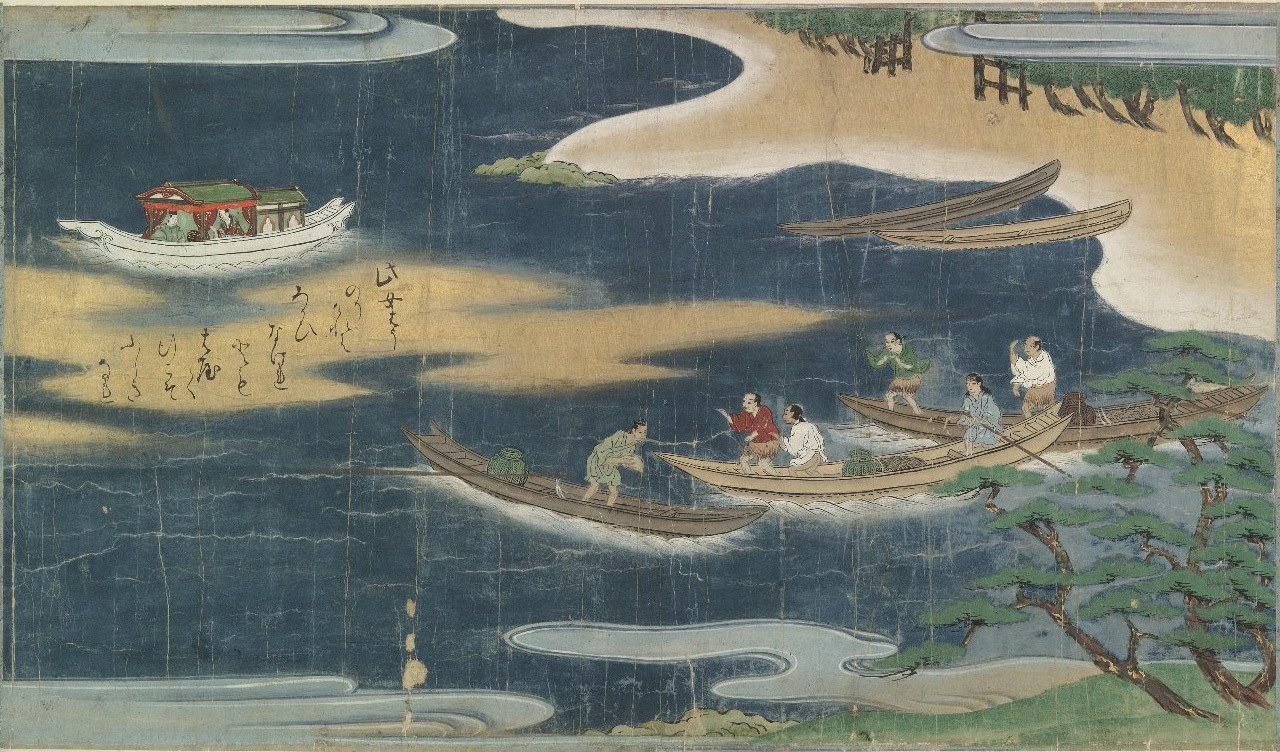
Urashima saves the turtle. ―From an Otogizōshi picture scroll in the Bodleian Library collection, (Note: MS. Jap. c. 4 (R)) late 16th or early 17th century.

The Otogi Bunko version, despite its conventional status as the type text, differs considerably from the typical children's storybook published in the modern day: the protagonist neither purchases the turtle from others to save it, nor rides the turtle. (Note: Urashima did not ride the turtle until the early 18th century.)

Group I texts are more similar to the modern version, as it contains the element of Urashima purchasing the turtle to save it. Additionally, this group explicitly gives the princess's name as Otomime (or "Kame-no-Otohime") whereas she remains unnamed in the Otogi Bunko group. And the expression tamatebako or "jeweled hand-box" familiar to modern readers is also seen in the main text of Group I, and not the other groups (the interpolated poem excepted).

The picture scroll in the collection of the Bodleian Library, Oxford University also belongs to Group I. (Note: The full text is transcribed in Japanese, published in Hayashi (2013), pp. 18–31.)

Hayashi Kouhei has highlighted the characteristics of the Group I texts as follows: 1) Urashima purchases a turtle caught by others, 2) Boat arrives to convey him to Horai, 3) The four seasons assuage rather than provoke his homesickness, (Note: That is, it is opposite the situation in Group I.) 4) The villagers in recognition of his longevity give him proper cremation, (Note: And a Buddhist training priest plays a role in convincing the villagers. This priest says Urashima lived 7000 years in the Takayasu, Keio, and Paris texts. The Nihon Mingeikan copy is a hybrid since it gives "700 years" here instead, and "Dragon Palace (Ryūgū)" rather than "Horai".) 5) Smoke from the tamatebako reaches Horai and Princess Otohime is grief-stricken.

== Other modern versions ==
=== Seki's version in English ===
The tale of "Urashima Taro" in Keigo Seki's anthology (translated into English 1963), was a version told in Nakatado District, Kagawa. In this variant, Urashima is localized as being from "Kitamae Oshima". It incorporates both the motif of the turtle being caught while fishing, and that of Urashima transforming into a crane at the end, which are found in the Otogizōshi.

Here, it was a three-tiered jeweled hand-box (三重ねの玉手箱, mitsugasane no tamatebako), that is to say, a stacked box that was given to Urashima. When he opened the lid, the first box (on the top) contained a crane's feather, and the second a puff of white smoke that turned him into an old man, and the third a mirror, which made him see for himself that he had suddenly grown old. The feather from the first box then attached itself to his back, and Urashima flew up to the sky, encircling his mother's grave.

=== Versions retold in English ===
The story entitled "The Fisher-boy Urashima" (1886) retold by Basil Hall Chamberlain, was number 8 in the "Japanese Fairy Tale Series", printed by Hasegawa Takejirō, the issuer of many such chirimen-bon or "crepe-paper books". Although the illustrations are not credited in the publication, they have been attributed to Kobayashi Eitaku.

There is no single base text in Japanese identifiable, although it has been conjectured that Chamberlain adapted from "a popular version" and not straying far from it except adding explanatory or instructive passages for young readers. Others have determined it must have been a composite consisting of older traditions from the Nihon Shoki and Man'yōshū, combined with the near-modern Otogizōshi storybook plot, Chamberlain preferring to incorporate details from the ancient texts, while eschewing embellishment from the Otogizōshi. Chamberlain has also published a versified version of the tale.

In Chamberlain's fairytale version, "Urashima" (not "Tarō") catches a tortoise (sic) (Note: It has been pointed out that while "tortoise" can be a turtle or a land turtle, the "tortoiseshell" of Japan is bekko, and this normally signifies a product taken from the shell of the hawksbill sea turtle.) while fishing on his boat, and releases it. The tortoise reappears in her true form as the Sea-God's daughter, and invites him to the Dragon Palace. (Note: Here, the Dragon Palace is not submerged in the ocean; the two of them reach it rowing by boat.) (Note: The halls of the four season are lacking in the Dragon Palace here.)

There the couple are married and live happily for 3 years, but Urashima misses seeing his parents and his brothers. The Dragon Princess reluctantly allows him to leave, giving him a box he is instructed never to open, for it will cause him never to be able to return to the palace. When he returns to his home village, his absence turns out to have been 400 years. Urashima now wishes to go back to the Dragon Palace but he does not know the means, and opens the box. He turns into a white-haired, wrinkled old man and dies. The ending by death concurs with older tradition, (Note: The Nihon Shoki, the Fudoki of Tango Province, and the Man'yōshū.) (Note: The death occurs in summer, in keeping with the Nihon Shoki which dates it to the seventh month of the 22nd year of Emperor Yuryaku.) and not the otogi-zōshi storybook.

Lafcadio Hearn, who lived in Japan and translated or adapted many ghost stories from the country, rewrote the Urashima tale under the title "The Dream of a Summer Day" in the late 19th century, working off of a copy of Chamberlain's "Japanese Fairy Tale Series" version.

=== Variations ===
As always with folklore, there are many different versions of this story.

There are other versions that add a further epilogue explaining the subsequent fate of Urashima Tarō after he turns into an old man. In one, he falls to dust and dies, in another, he transforms into a crane and flies up to the sky. In another, he grows gills and leaps into the sea, whereby he regains his youth.

In another version Urashima ate a magic pill that gave him the ability to breathe underwater. In another version, he is swept away by a storm before he can rescue the turtle.

In another version, Urashima does stay with Otohime and they conceive a child.

== History ==
The full name Urashima Tarō was not given to the character until the 15th century (the Muromachi period), first appearing in a genre of illustrated popular fiction known as otogizōshi, and in the kyōgen play adaptation.

The story itself can be found in much older sources, dating to the 8th century (the Nara period), where the protagonist is styled either "Urashima no ko" or "Ura (no) Shimako", attested in earlier sources such as the Fudoki for Tango Province (Tango no Kuni Fudoki, 丹後国風土記) that survived in excerpts, the Man'yōshū and the Nihon Shoki.

More recent editions of these texts tend to favor the "Ura (no) Shimako" reading, although some consider this debatable. (Note: The recent "Shimako" reading is based on the alternative name given as "Tsutsukawa no Shimako (Shimako of Tsutsukawa)" in the Tango Province Fudoki excerpt, which a number of scholars consider the oldest record. However, the same source also records the poem allegedly by the hero which clearly gives the reading in phonetics (in man'yōgana) as "Urashima-no-ko (宇良志麻能古)". The proponents of the other reading discount the poem by assuming it to be of a later date.)

It has also been proposed that it was not until the Heian Period that the misreading "Urashima (no) ko" became current, because names with the suffix -ko ("child") came to be regarded as female, even though it once applied to either gender. When the texts were written for the kyōgen theatre, the character's name underwent further change to Urashima Tarō, with -tarō ("great youth") being a common suffix in male names. Or perhaps the name was borrowed from Tarō kaja who is a stock character in kyōgen.

=== Dragon Palace ===
The Man'yōshū ballad mentions not only the woman of the Immortal Land, but her father as the Sea God (Watatsumi). Although this Sea God cannot be automatically equated with the Dragon God or Dragon King, due to the influence of the Chinese mythology of Nine Offspring of the Dragon in the Tang period, it has been speculated that the turtle princess must have been the Dragon King's daughter in even those early versions.

The otherworld Urashima visited was not the "Dragon Palace" (Ryūgū) until the otogi-zōshi versions appeared. The heroine then became Otohime, the younger daughter of the Dragon King.

=== Relative dates ===
As for the relative dating of these texts, an argument has been advanced that places the Fudoki version as the oldest. (Note: By proponents such as Akihisa Shigematsu (p. 107) and Yū Mizuno 1:63, cited by McKeon.) The argument dates the Tango fudoki to shortly after 715, but the compilers refer to an earlier record by Iyobe no Umakai, which was identical in content. It has even been suggested by Shūichi Katō that this Umakai originally adapted this tale into Japanese from a similar Chinese tale.

== Tango Fudoki ==
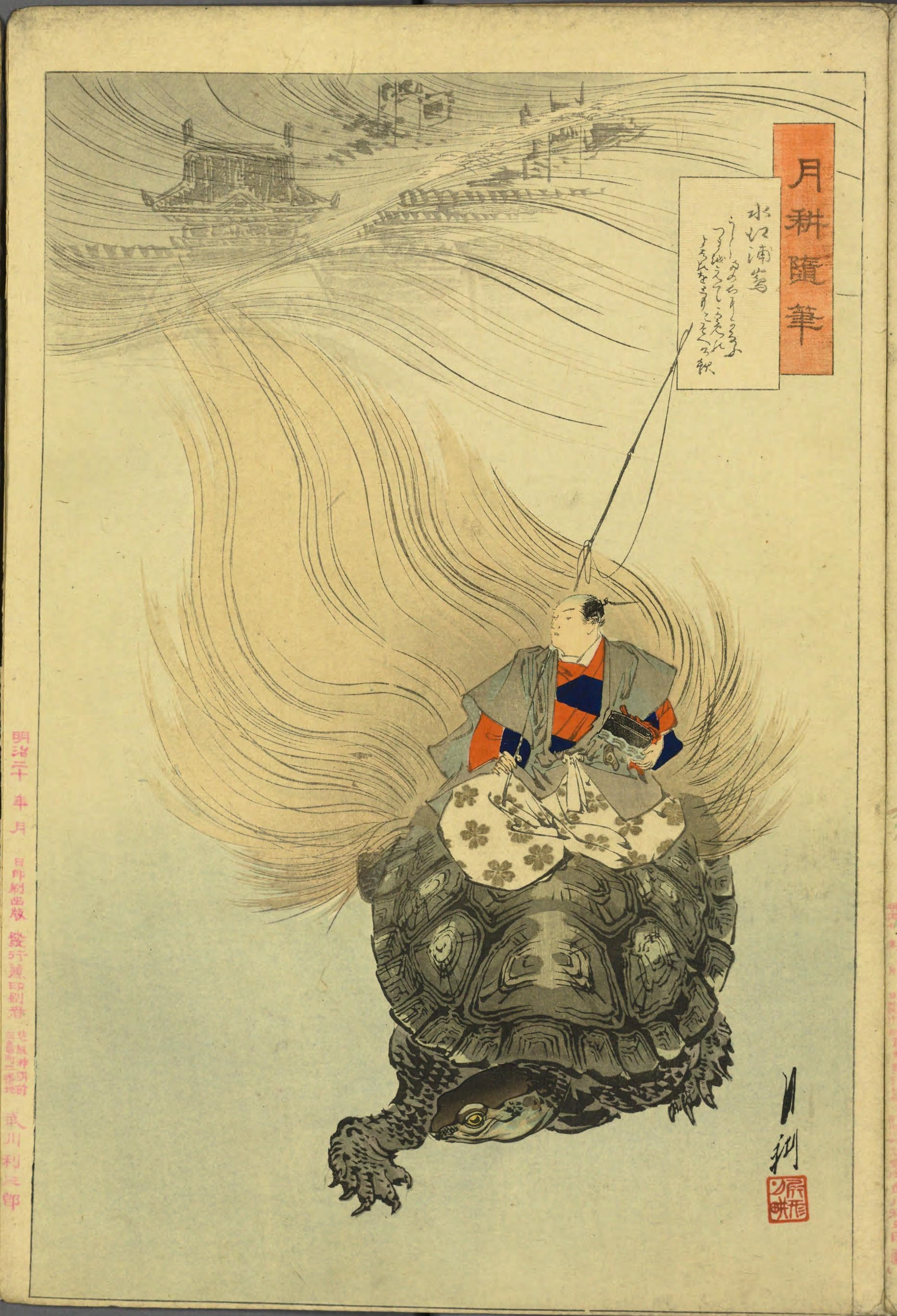
Mizuenoe no Urashima riding a turtle with flowing tail (mino game). Depiction of him riding a turtle appeared quite late, in the early 18th century. —Ogata Gekkō, Gekkō zuihitsu (1887).

In this version, (Note: Translated in full by Holmes; also see Akima.) the protagonist is referred to as "Urashimako (Note: Urashimako is the neutral form of convenience, it has been debated whether it should be read "Urashima no ko" or "Ura no Shimako".) of Mizunoe" (or "Urashimako of Tsutsukawa in Yosa-gun".

Urashimako catches a five-coloured turtle and keeps it in his boat, and during his sleep, the creature transforms into a beautiful woman. She identifies herself as someone from the household of immortals, and proposes to take him to the place of immortals, which may be Horaisan (Mount Penglai) or "Tokoyo-no-kuni" ("Timeless Land" or "Land of Eternity"). (Note: It is written as Horai (Mount Penglai) in the straight Chinese text, but it is also annotated to indicate it should be read as Tokoyo-no-kuni.)

They are greeted by first seven, then eight children, who represent the constellations of Pleiades and Taurus (or more precisely the Hyades cluster) who address him as the "husband of Kame Hime (Princess Turtle)". The remainder is mostly the same as the typical tale.

After three years, the man develops a longing for his parents and homeland. The princess is saddened, but imparts him with a jeweled comb box (玉匣, tamakushige), forbidding him to open it if he wished ever to return to her. He returns and finds no trace of his home or family, except that he is remembered as a man who disappeared long ago, and would be over three hundred years old if still alive. Forgetting the promise, he opens the box, whereupon a beautiful figure like a fragrant orchid is carried away to the heavens with the clouds, and he realizes he can never meet the princess again. (Note: An alternate reading is that a cloud rose up, and so too a certain sweet fragrance.) Still, the couple are somehow (supernaturally) able to exchange poems. These poems are recorded in phonetic man'yōgana.

== Nihon Shoki ==
In the Nihon Shoki, Urashimako of Mizunoe is mentioned in the entry for Autumn, 7th month the 22nd year of reign of Emperor Yūryaku. Aston's translation assigns this the year 478 A.D. The entry states that Urashimako (child Urashima, child of Urashima, etc.) of Mizunoe while fishing on a boat, caught a turtle which transformed into a woman. They went into the sea, and reached Mount Hōrai (glossed in kana as Tokoyo), where they saw immortals (仙衆 (ひじり)).

As to the phrase that they go "into the sea" implies, the Mount Hōrai as conceived here may be a submarine island, a suggestion made by Japanese literature professor Ōkuma Kiichirō.

== Manyoshu ==
A poem reflecting upon the legend of Urashima of Mizunoe occurs in the Man'yōshū. The piece is ascribed to Takahashi no Mushimaro. Early translations include the prose rendition by Aston, and the ballad-form by Chamberlain.

In this version, the woman of the Immortal Land (Tokoyo) appears as the daughter of the Sea God (Watatsumi no kami).

== Localizations ==
=== Yokohama ===
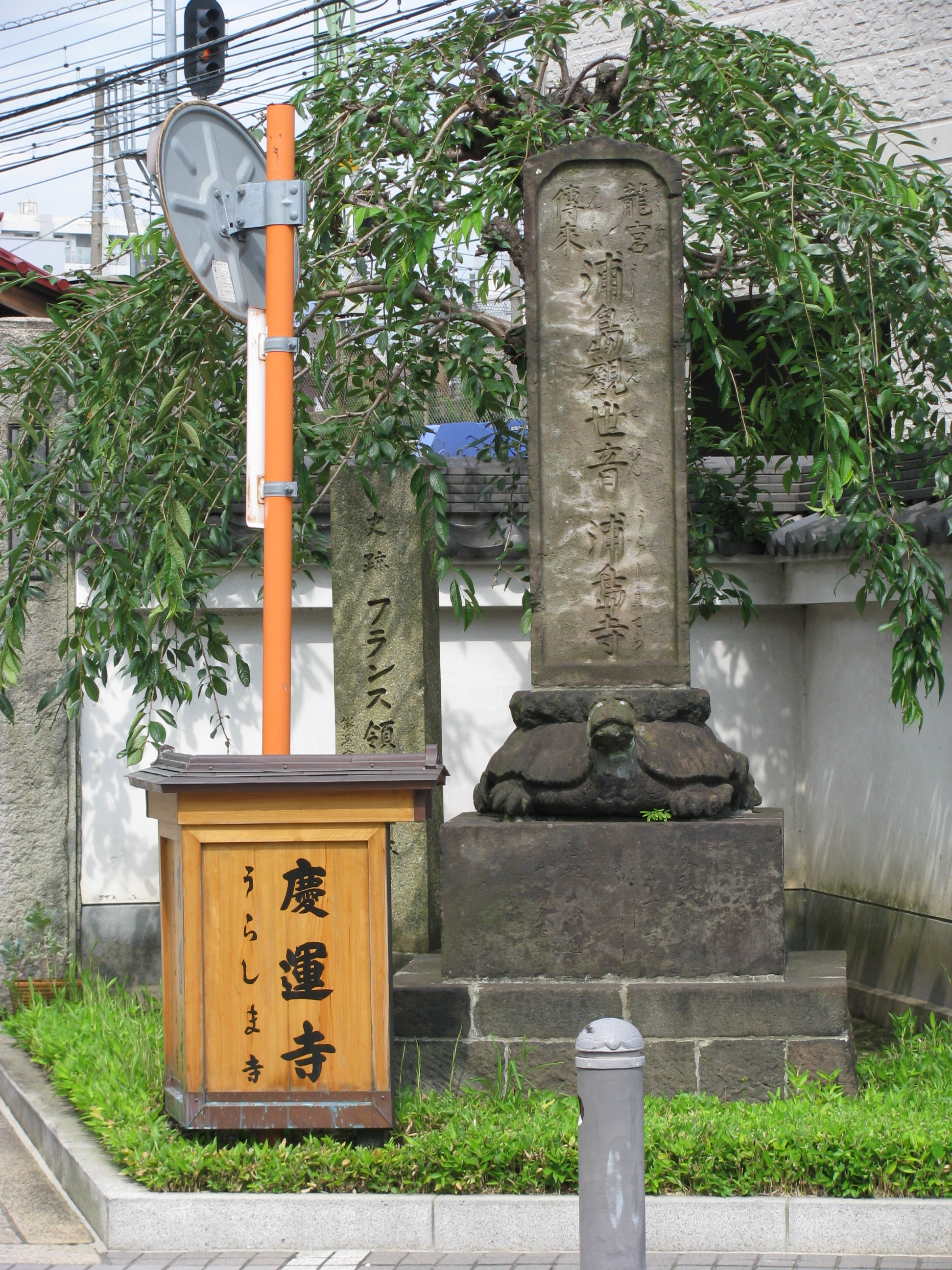
Keiun-ji, the stele that reads "Ryūgū denrai Urashima Kanzeon Urashima-tera", which used to be at Kampuku-ji.

Basil Hall Chamberlain (1880) indicated the presence of a temple dedicated to Urashima at Kanagawa-ku, Yokohama, which housed several relics such as Urashima's fishing-line, and the casket (tamatebako). But when Ernest Satow went there with Chamberlain on 2 May 1880, there was nothing left to see except the statue of Kannon (Kanzeon), the bodhisattva of mercy.

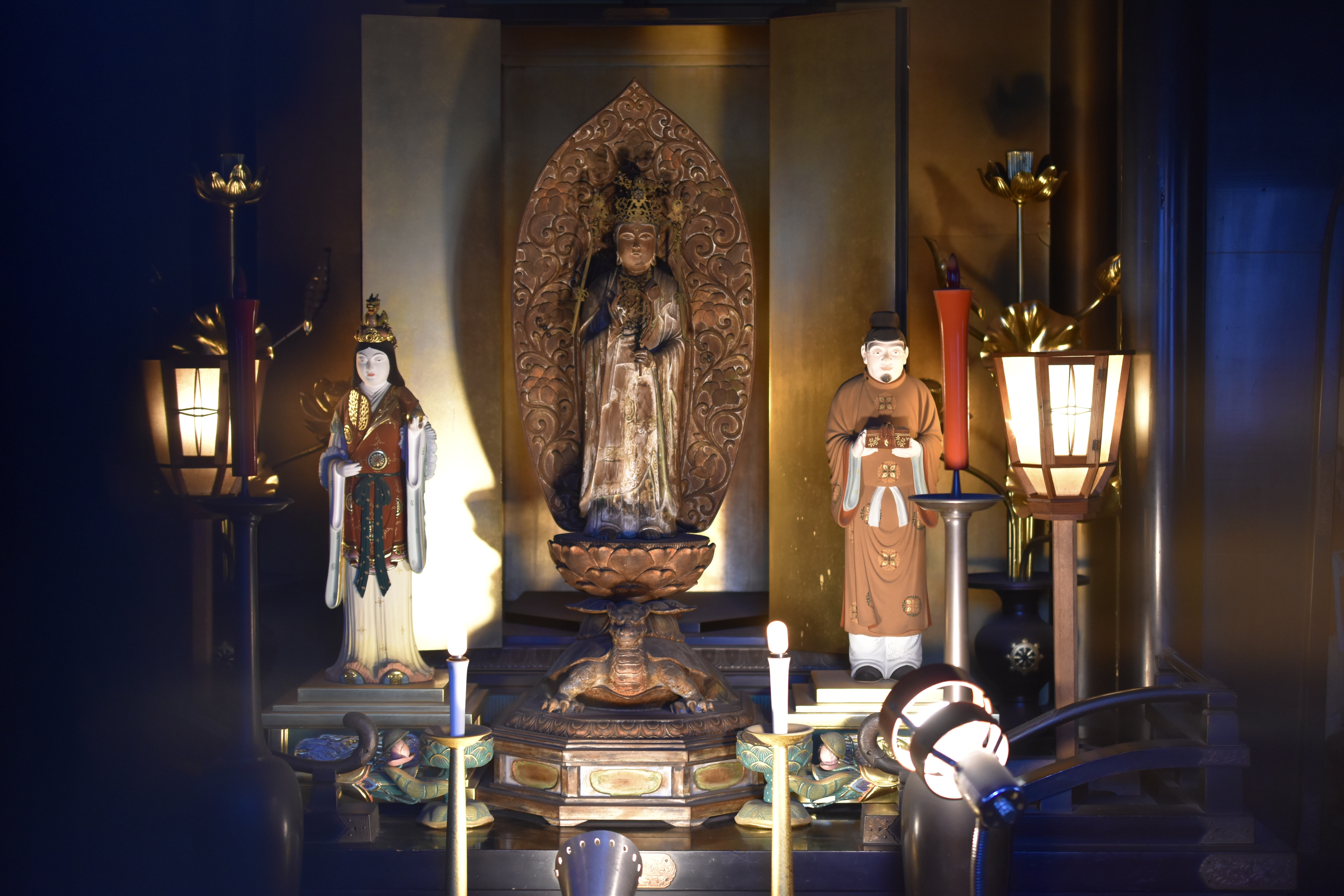
Statues of Kannon, Urashima Tarō and Otohime enshrined at Keiun-ji, Yokohama.

Neither recorded the name to the temple, but Japanese sources write that the so-called Urashima-dera (Urashima Temple) used to be Kanpuku-ji (観福寺), until it burned down in 1868, (Note: One source says this was still during Keiō 4 in (1868) another wrote "27th day of 1st month of Meiji 1" Japan decided that dates in Keio 4, be retroactively rewritten as dates in Meiji 1.) and the temple, including the Kannon goddess statue got translated to Keiun-ji (慶運寺) in 1872.

The old Urashima-dera sat on a mountain top. There is a circulating pamphlet which shows the view of the harbor from this vantage point, depicting the fleet of Black Ships led by Commodore Perry's fleet in 1852–1854.

Local legend also claims native ties to Urashima Tarō, claiming that his father Urashima Tayū was originally from somewhere not far from Yokohama, in Miura District, Kanagawa in Sagami Province. But the father moved to Tango Province. This legend adds that when Urashima Tarō returned from the Dragon Place, he was guided to seek his parents' grave in "Shirahata, Musashi Province" (in today's Yokohama).

He finally found the grave, thanks to Princess Oto-hime who lit up an illuminating light on a pine branch. (Note: A pine named Ryūto no matsu (龍燈の松; 'dragon lantern pine'), which was this illuminated pine according to legend, stood until it was cut down when the railway opened.) Tarō built a hut to live here, housing the goddess statue from the Dragon Palace. The hut later became Kampuku-ji temple.

=== Okinawa ===
Chamberlain noted the theory that the Dragon Palace might be a romanticized notion of Okinawa, since "Ryūgū" (Dragon Palace) and Ryūkyū (Okinawa) are near homophones.

Recorded in Irō setsuden (遺老説伝; "Accounts Left by Old Men") of the 18th century, Tale 103 "A person of Yonaha village visits the Dragon Palace" is considered analogous to Urashima Tarō. In it, a certain man of Yonaha village in Haebaru finds a lock of black hair and returns it to a beautiful maiden. She leads him to the Dragon Palace. Three months pass and the man wishes to return, but the goddess reveals 33 generations have already passed in his absence. The man receives a folded-up piece of paper he is forbidden from unwrapping, but he opens this packet and a piece of white hair clings to him, turning him into an old man, and he dies. He was enshrined at the place which was named Usani-daki, because the man had "sat and reposed" (usani) in his despair.

Similar tales are found on Miyako-jima and other places. Yanagita Kunio felt that the notion of the Dragon Palace shared its origin with the concept of Niruya (Niraikanai) in the southerly islands of Japan.

Irō setsuden also records a similar tale, number 42, about Yoshinawa Fuyako (善縄大屋子), which describes a man who, bidden by a mysterious woman appeared before him, carried a large turtle to his home, which bit and gave him a terrible wound so that he was buried. But he turned out not to have died a mortals death, and lived on.

=== Kiso, Nagano ===
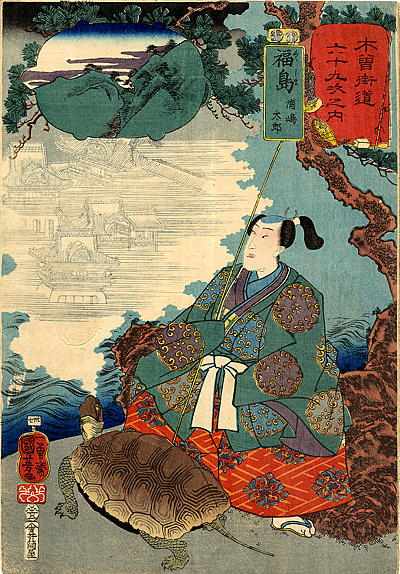
Utagawa Kuniyoshi, Fukushima-juku (one of the 69 stations of the Kiso-kaidō).

Local legend has it that Urashima Tarō once dwelled in the mountains of Kiso, Nagano. This legend originated in near-modern times, from the late Muromachi to Edo periods.

Although a contrived piece of fiction, the old-style jōruri Urashima Tarō (『浦嶋太郎』) situates its story in the vicinity of this local legend, namely Agematsu-juku. (Note: Agematsu-juku is actually adjacent to Fukushima-juku of Kuniyoshi's ukiyo-e painting.) Urashima Tarō appears here as a child born after a local couple prays to Togakushi Myōjin. He and Tamayori-hime fall in love. She is very much a mortal, but after she commits suicide in Ina River (tributary of Kiso River), she becomes transformed into a supernatural being serving the Dragon Palace. A scale cloak lets her transform into a turtle, in which guise, she is reunited with Urashima Tarō who is fishing in Ina River. Note the "catching of the turtle" scene is transposed from ocean to a river in the mountains.

== Comparative mythology ==
The story bears varying degrees of similarity to folktales from other cultures. Rip Van Winkle is the foremost familiar example, although strictly speaking this cannot be called a "folktale", since it is a fictional work by Washington Irving loosely based on folklore. Nevertheless, Urashima has been labeled the "Japanese Rip van Winkle", even in academic folkloristic literature. "Urashima" (Note: Or "Urashima Tarō Jōtai" (浦島太郎状態).) is also a Japanese metaphor similar to "Rip Van Winkle" for someone who feels lost in a world that has changed in their absence.

This pair of tales may not be the closest matching among the motif group. Writing in the 19th century, Lafcadio Hearn suggested that Irving wrote another piece called "The Adelantado of the Seven Cities", based on Portuguese tradition, which bore an even stronger resemblance to Urashima. Japanese art collector William Anderson also wrote that a certain Chinese tale was closer to "Rip Van Winkle" than Urashima was.

That Chinese analogue is the anecdote of the woodcutter Wang Zhi, (Note: Wang Chih (王質).) who after watching immortals playing a board game discovers many years have passed. The piece is a selection in the Shuyiji (Note: Shu i Chi) or "Accounts of Strange Things", and is also known as the legend of Lankeshan (Note: "Lan-k'o shan") or "Rotten Axe Handle Mountain". Sometimes this Chinese tale is conjectured as a possible actual source for Urashima, but there is lack of consensus among folklorists regarding their interrelationship.

Other cognate tales include the Irish legend of Oisín (Note: Ossian) who met Niamh and spent his life with her in Tír na nÓg, and the Vietnamese legend of Từ Thức, who aids a goddess arrested for plucking a peony flower during a festival. In both these cases, the hero is united with a goddess who dwells in a land beyond the sea. Từ Thức's story is collected in Truyền kỳ mạn lục by Nguyễn Dữ.

The tale of Urashima Taro holds many similarities with tales of the international catalogue Aarne–Thompson–Uther Index, grouped under type ATU 681, "The Relativity of Time". A similar story is The Marsh King's Daughter, a literary fairy tale by Hans Christian Andersen. However, Hiroko Ikeda's Japanese index of folktales lists Urashima Taro as type 470*, "The Dragon Palace" or "Urashima Taroo".

== Commemoration ==
A shrine on the western coast of the Tango Peninsula in northern Kyoto Prefecture, named Urashima Jinja, contains an old document describing a man, Urashimako, who left his land in 478 A.D. and visited a land where people never die. He returned in 825 A.D. with a Tamatebako. Ten days later he opened the box, and a cloud of white smoke was released, turning Urashimako into an old man. Later that year, after hearing the story, Emperor Junna ordered Ono no Takamura to build a shrine to commemorate Urashimako's strange voyage, and to house the Tamatebako and the spirit of Urashimako.

== Adaptations ==
The animated adaptation Urashima Tarō of the tale, premiered in 1918, is among some of the oldest anime created in Japan, the same year that Oz author Ruth Plumly Thompson adapted it as "Urashima and the Princess of the Sea" for The Philadelphia Public Ledger.

The story influenced various works of fiction and a number of films. In 1945, Japanese writer Osamu Dazai published Otogizōshi ("fairytale book"), which includes a much expanded version of the story. Urashima's tale, as the other three included in the Otogizōshi, is used mostly as a platform for Dazai's own thoughts and musings. Ursula K. Le Guin's short story "A Fisherman of the Inland Sea" (or "Another Story", 1994) is a reception of the Urashima story set in the Ekumen or Hainish universe.

The story was adapted in Brazil in the 1960s for use in an advertising campaign by airline Varig to promote the first direct flights between Rio de Janeiro and Tokyo. The campaign was produced by Lynxfilm and created by Ruy Perotti. The theme, sung by Rosa Miyake, became famous throughout the country.

The Ultra Q episode title "Grow Up! Little Turtle" is largely based on Urashima Tarō's tale, along with elements of "The Boy Who Cried Wolf" and the original Gamera film. In it, Tarō is a schoolboy given to making up stories who is trying to grow a turtle to 99 cm, at which point he believes it will take him to the Dragon Palace.

== See also ==
- Urashima 8000, JAMSTEC's autonomous underwater vehicle capable of diving up to depth of 8,000 meters
- "'39", a Queen song
- Lankeshan ji
- Yuri's Brush with Magic by Maureen Wartski, a young adult novel that integrates the Urashima Taro myth into narrative
- Isekai, an anime and manga genre that has roots in the Urashima Tarō story
- Pandora's box, a magic box which spread disaster when opened in Greek mythology
- King asleep in mountain, several legends of people hidden away in time
- "Rip Van Winkle"
- The Picture of Dorian Gray
- Kakudmi and Revati
- Herla
- Oisín
- The Voyage of Bran
- Iara (mythology)
- Urashima effect, another name for time dilation in the theory of relativity
- Honi ha-M'agel
- The Wife from the Dragon Palace
- Guingamor
