= Tamatebako =

Fictional box

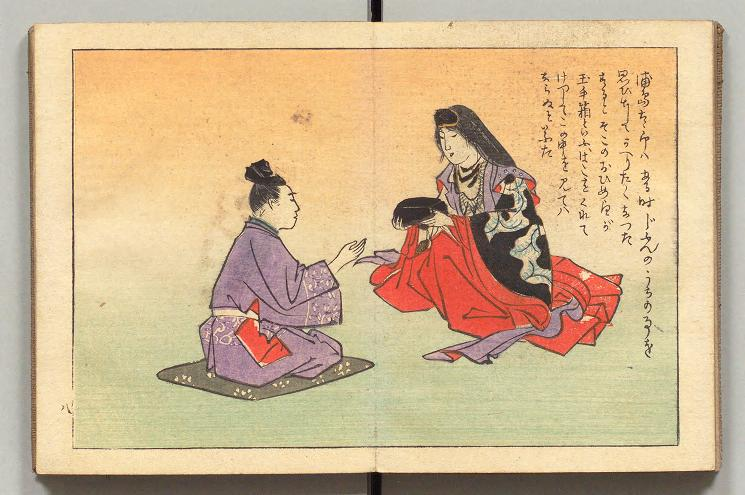
Oto-hime gives the tamatebako to Urashima Tarō (Matsuki Heikichi, 1899)

A tamatebako (玉手箱) "jeweled hand box", "jewel box", "jeweled box", "treasure box", "casket", etc., is a mysterious box that in the Japanese folk tale "Urashima Tarō", is a parting gift that the fisherman Urashima Tarō receives from mistress of the sea (Otohime), after his stay at the Dragon Palace (or Hōrai), to which he was invited after saving a turtle.

Katami no hako "memento box" is another name by which the box is referred to in the tale.

Tamakushige "comb box" is the name that occurs in earlier precursors, such as the anecdote of Ura-no-Shimako (Urashima-no-ko) in the Fudoki of Tango Province and the Manyōshū (8th century). The term tamatebako was first employed in reference to the tale in a quoted poem in Otogizōshi.

== Etymology and aliases ==
Tamatebako is literally rendered "jewel-hand-box" but sometimes it is seen as not imparting any special meaning and translated as "casket". It was glossed as meaning a "beautiful box" by McKeon.

The first instance of its use in the Urashima tale is in an inserted poem in the Otogizōshi. And there seems to be a double entendre word-play since tama can mean "jewel" or "soul".

The box is also referred to as katami no hako (かたみのはこ) (Note: May be written かたみの筥 or かたみの箱.) "memento box" in Otogizōshi texts.

== Modern version ==
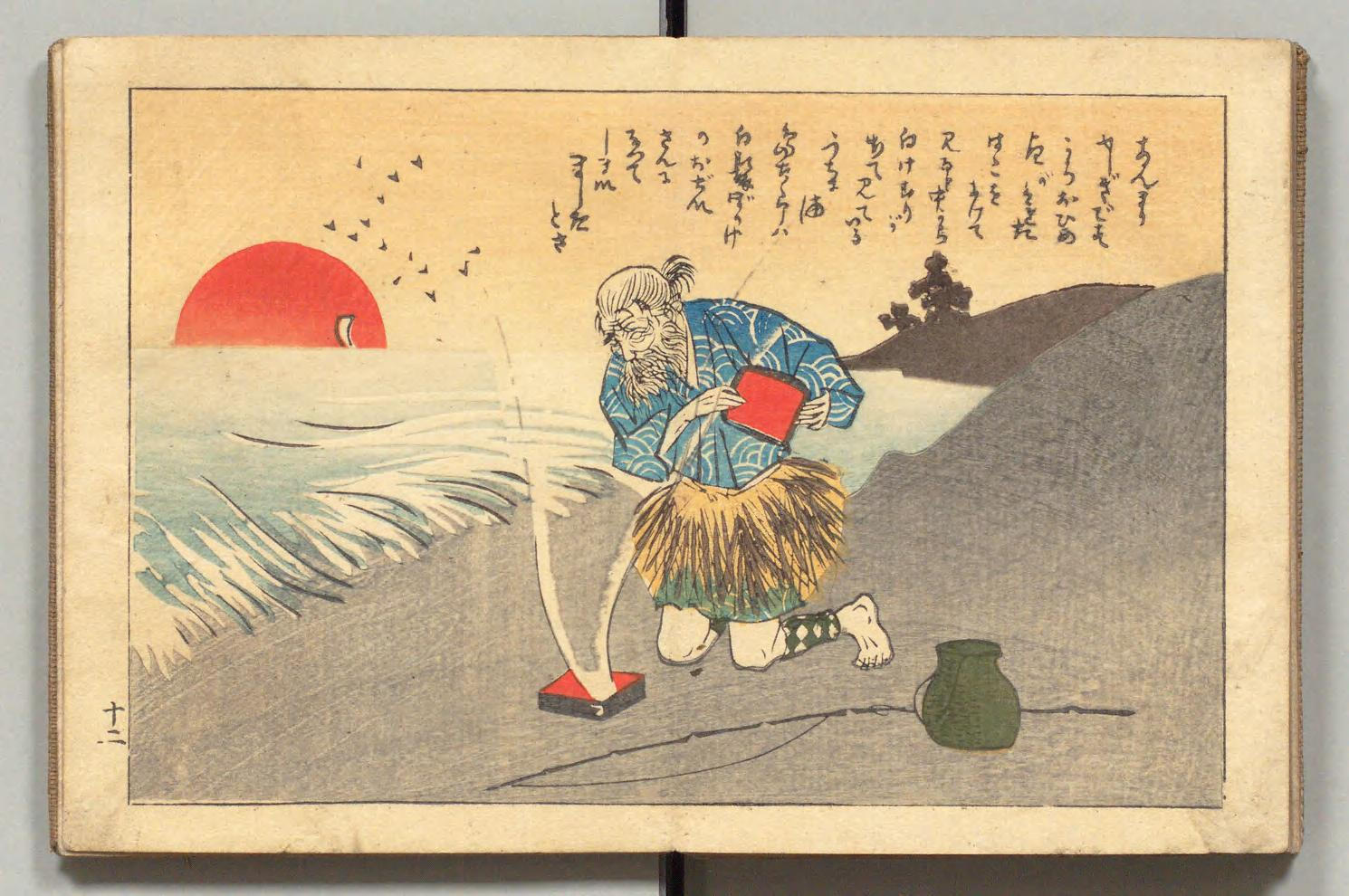
Urashima Tarō opens the box and is transformed into an old man (Matsuki Heikichi, 1899)

The tamatebako appears in the story of "Urashima Tarō", whose modern version are generally all based on the national textbook. It is told that Urashima Tarō the fisherman was invited to a sea palace (Ryūgū or Dragon Palace) by the princess (Otohime) after saving a turtle. He spent a number of days, (Note: Unspecified duration. The duration for various versions is tabulated on Holmes (2014), p. 106) fed and entertained (Note: He watched the fish dance in the 4th edition) and upon his leaving received the tamatebako ("treasure box") with explicit instructions to never open the box. When he returned, his parents had died and he recognized no one. In dismay he forgot the princess's caution. When he opened the tamatebako, a white puff of smoke escaped, and he was transformed into an old, white haired man.

It is understood during the short time he spent at the Dragon Palace, many years had elapsed in the world back home. Otohime had stored his old age away in the tamatebako, which Urashima Tarō released.

== Seki's variant ==
A three-tiered jeweled hand-box is given to Urashima Tarō and the princess actually encourages him to use it in the moment of need. This is what occurs in "Urashima Taro" variant collected by Keigo Seki, a telling from Nakatado District, Kagawa.

When he opened the lid of the box, the first box contained crane's feather; the second box issued a puff of white smoke that transformed him into an old man; the third box held a mirror for him to look at himself. The feather from the first box then fastened itself on his back, now transforming Urashima into a crane, and the princess appeared in the guise of a turtle to see him.

A version with the three-tiered "Tamatebako" (jeweled hand-box) was also published in English by the Japanese foreign ministry in 1969.

== Early versions ==
The box is referred to as tamakushige (玉櫛笥 / 玉匣) "comb box" in a precursor tale, recorded as historical in the Fudoki of Tango Province, where the principal character is known by the slightly different name, Ura-no-Shimako, and the female identifies herself as a member of the immortals.

Shimako's visit to the Horaisan (Mount Penglai) or "Tokoyo-no-kuni" ("Timeless Land" or "Land of Eternity") (Note: The Chinese text Horai (Mount Penglai) is annotated with the Japanese reading.) lasts three years, at the end of which he is given the box as a gift.

The legend in the Manyōshū refers also to a tamakushige (玉篋), translated "jewel-casket" by Aston, which Urashima receives from the lady or daughter of the Sea-God (Watatsumi).

== Poem and expression ==
In several of the Otogizōshi texts of Urashima Tarō is inserted the waka poem which is an allusion to Urashima:

Kimi ni au yo wa urashima ga tamatebako akete kuyashiki waga namida kana (君にあふ夜は浦島が玉手箱あけて悔しきわが涙かな)
"The night of meet you [is like] Urashima opening the tametebako, [when night turns to dawn] the regret and my tears".

The "akete kuyashiki" in the poem might be restated as "mortified by the opening" of the box.

The poem led to the common stock phrase akete kuyashiki tamatebako (開けて悔しき玉手箱) "opened to his regret (mortification), the tamatebako". (Note: The stock phrase is noted as being a modern saying, as well as being employed figuratively in Chikamatsu Monzaemon's puppet play The Love Suicides at Amijima.)

== Local legends ==
A Tamatebako is enshrined in the Urashima Jinja in the Tango Peninsula in northern Kyoto Prefecture.
