= Johann Gottfried Hoche =

Johann Gottfried Hoche (25 September 1762 in Gratzungen – 2 May 1836 in Gröningen) was a German Protestant theologian and historian. He was the father of writer Louise Aston (1814–1871).

He studied history and theology at the University of Halle, where his instructors included Johann Salomo Semler and Johann August Nösselt. In 1800 he was named second clergyman in the town of Gröningen, near Halberstadt. In 1805 he attained the positions of senior minister and superintendent, and soon afterwards, was appointed to the consistory in Halberstadt. Following the dissolution of Halberstadt consistory in 1816, he was offered a position in Magdeburg, but chose to remain in Gröningen, where he died in 1836.

== Published works ==
He is largely known for his historical works on the Netherlands and northwestern Germany, however, among his better writings was a book associated with central Germany, titled Vollständige Geschichte der Grafschaft Hohenstein, der Herrschaften Lohra und Klettenberg, Heeringen, Kelbra, Scharzfeld, Lutterberg, etc. ("Complete history of the county Hohenstein, the dominions of Lohra and Klettenberg, Heeringen, Kelbra, Scharzfeld, Lutterberg", etc. 1790). Other noted works by Hoche are:

- Historische Untersuchung Uber Die Niederlandischen Kolonien in Niederdeutschland, 1791 – Historical study of the Dutch colonies in Lower Germany.
- Geschichte der Statthalterschaft in den Niederlanden, 1796 – History of the governorship in the Netherlands.
- Des Amtmanns-Tochter von Lüde, Eine Wertheriade fur Aeltern, Jünglinge und Mädchen, 1797 – The bailiff's daughter of Lüde (a novel).
- Ruhestunden für Frohsinn und häusliches Glück, with Johann Karl Christoph Nachtigal (4 parts, 1798–1800).
- Reise durch Osnabrück und Niedermünster in das Saterland, Ostfriesland und Gröningen, 1800 (Google Books: 1, 2; SLUB: 1 = 2) – Journey through Osnabrück and Niedermünster into Saterland, East Frisia and Gröningen.
- Geschichte des päpstlichen Jubeljahres, 1825 – History of the Papal Jubilee; a book that was placed on the Index Librorum Prohibitorum.
