= MV Rip Van Winkle =

Coordinates: 41.918179°N 73.983020°W

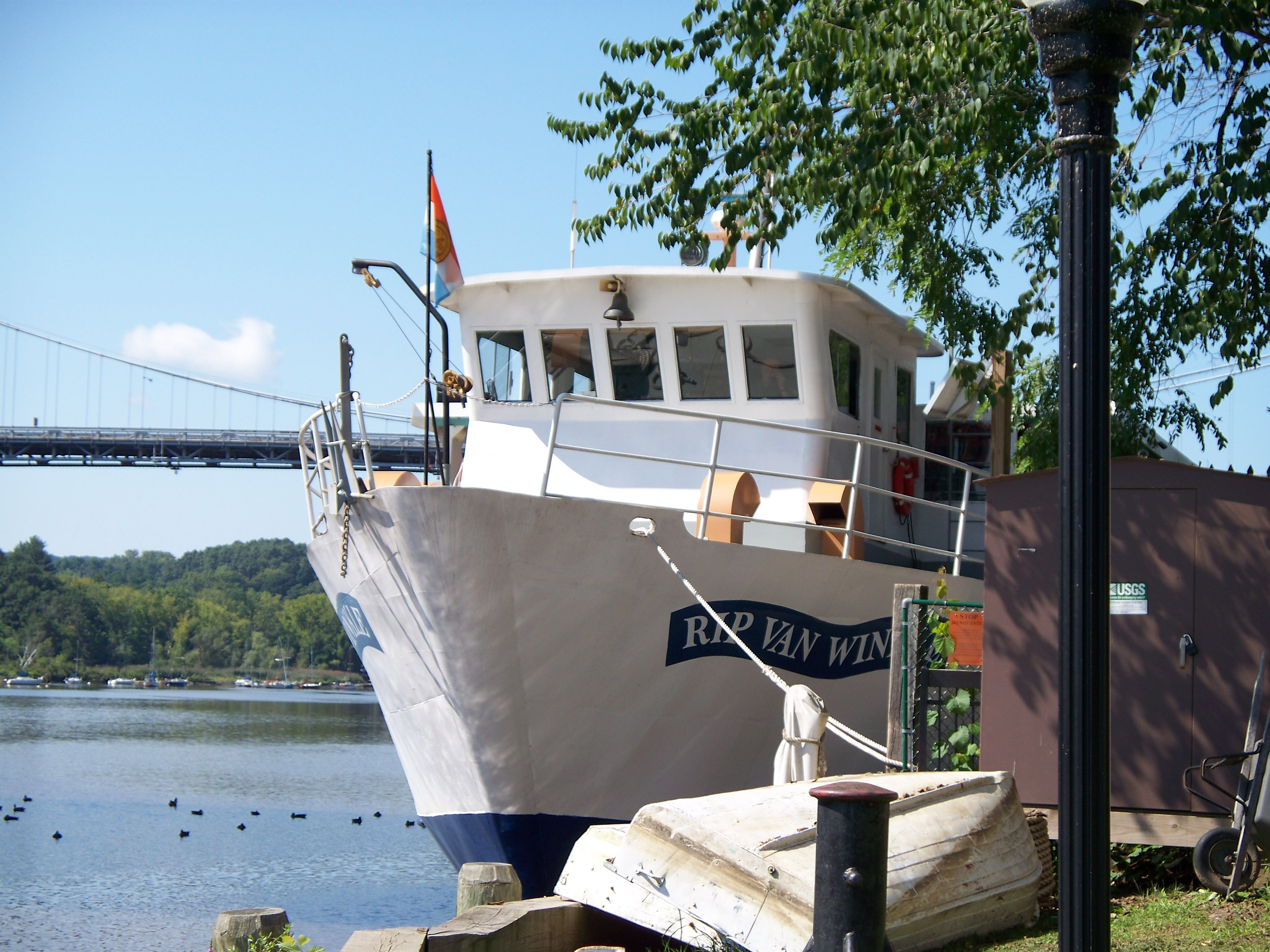
- M/V Rip Van Winkle at her home dock

History

United States
- Name: M/V Rip Van Winkle
- Owner: Hudson River Cruises
- Operator: Hudson River Cruises
- Builder: Edward T. Gamage, East Boothbay, Maine
- Completed: 1980
- In service: 1982
- Homeport: Kingston, New York
- Identification: MMSI number: 367029890; Callsign: WSE2785
- Status: Active

General characteristics
- Class & type: Tour Boat
- Displacement: 200 tons
- Length: 125 ft (38 m);
- Beam: 28 ft (8.5 m)
- Draft: 7.5 ft (2.3 m)
- Installed power: 960 HP
- Propulsion: 2 Diesel engines (Detroit 12v71) Generators: 1 Westerbeke 20kw, 1 Northern Lights 65kw
- Speed: 12 kn (14 mph; 22 km/h)
- Capacity: 300-350 people (388 maximum legal capacity)

M/V Rip Van Winkle is a Hudson River tour boat based in Kingston, New York. She was built for use in the oil industry in 1980, but has served as a passenger vessel in New York State, and as a ferry for the US Navy.

== Tours ==
The boat leaves Kingston's Rondout Creek, heads south down to Hyde Park, New York, and then turns north and returns to Kingston. The total time is 2 hours and the trip is narrated. Sightseeing tours have also included "three-hour narrated tours to the Vanderbilt estate, in Hyde Park." Rip Van Winkle also offers various specialty cruises throughout the year, such as music cruises and murder mystery dinner party cruises, and can be chartered for parties and weddings.

== History ==
Rip Van Winkle was built to be an oil industry shore well platform service vessel, by Edward T. Gamage in East Boothbay, Maine in 1980. She was purchased by Charles Robertson, owner of the New England Steamboat lines, who converted the boat to passenger service. An upper deck was added as were lavatories, snack bar and liquid bar. She was put into service in 1982 out of Haddam CT to Greenport and Sag Harbor, Long Island as the "Yankee Clipper." During her time with the New England Steamboat lines, the vessel was contracted in service to the Navy as a ferry boat for the sailors in New London. Hudson River Cruises bought the boat in 1985 and brought it to Kingston, New York in September of that year. Rip van Winkle went into service on the Hudson River in 1986.

== See also ==
- Rip Van Winkle (disambiguation)
