= Luise Aston =

German author and feminist (1814–1871)

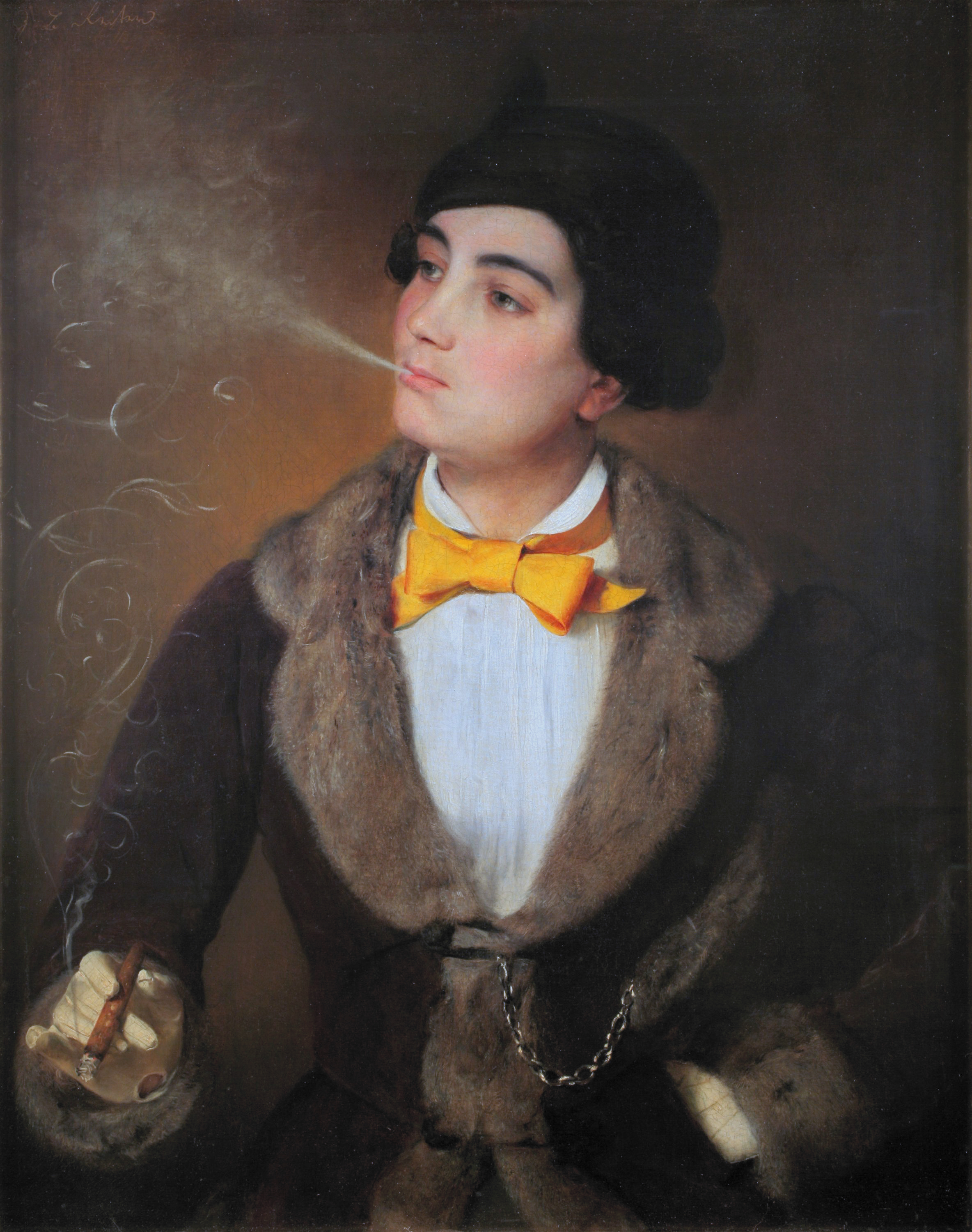
- Portrait of Luise Aston by Johann Baptist Reiter
- Born: November 26, 1814; Gröningen
- Died: December 21, 1871 (aged 57); Wangen im Allgäu
- Father: Johann Gottfried Hoche

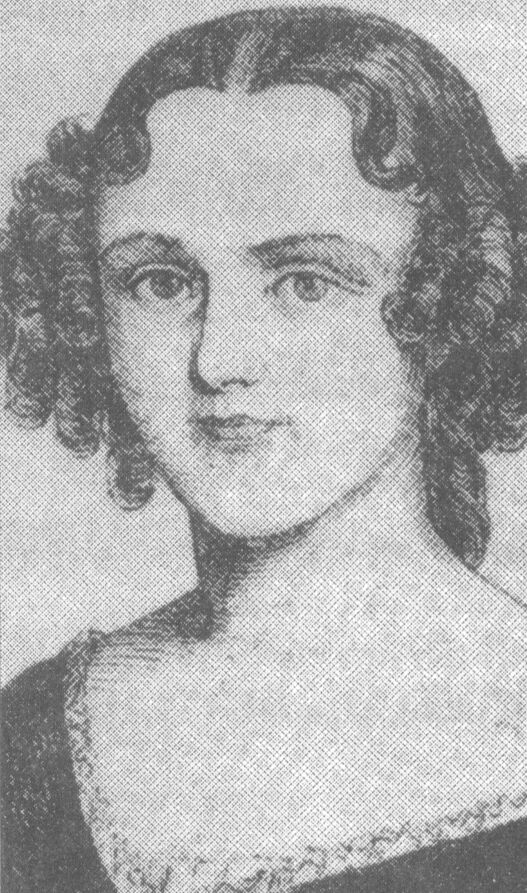
Luise Aston

Luise Aston or Louise Aston (26 November 1814, Gröningen – 21 December 1871, Wangen im Allgäu) was a German author and feminist, who championed the rights of women, and was known for dressing in male attire. She was an advocate of democracy, free love, and sexuality.

== Biography ==
Luise Hoche was born on 26 November 1814, in Gröningen, the daughter of the theologian Johann Gottfried Hoche. She married Samuel Aston, a wealthy factory owner of English descent, in 1835. She was later to say that her father had forced her to marry. The spouses lived in Magdeburg, where she caused scandals in the local society. In 1839, was given a divorce in Berlin. The couple remarried and divorced a second time in 1844. After her second divorce she lived in Berlin with the poet Rudolf Gottschall, befriended Otto von Corvin and Max Stirner and walked around on the street smoking cigars dressed as a male.

She was an atheist, a democrat, and a republican, and she criticized marriage. She also believed in love outside of marriage: as a woman was often forced to marry for money and she was economically dependent on her husband, she reasoned it was difficult to marry for love and to keep love in a marriage. Marriage under such circumstances was for these reasons a form of prostitution. The contemporary women's movement had similar views, but considered it dangerous to expose them for fear of being considered immoral. Aston was therefore criticized by both the women's movement and the conservative society for different reasons because of her view that it should be allowed to have a sexual love relationship without being married.

She was called a whore, a shameless homewrecker, and a seductress by the press. She was watched by the secret police, who sent spies after her and read her letters. Finally, she was banished from Berlin in 1846 because her way of life was seen as threatening to conventional order: "I must leave Berlin within eight days because I have expressed and lived according to ideas who were dangerous for the conservative law and order." In 1848, she took part in the revolutionary wave in Germany. She served in the Freikorps in Schleswig during the war.

She was active within the democracy movement. She started a paper, which was stopped by the censorship authorities. She was expelled again but returned with a false passport. In 1850, she married the doctor Eduard Meier, with whom she became very happy. They moved to Bremen. They were often harassed by the authorities as dangerous radicals.

Aston was watched by the police, who sent agents to her home and read her letters. Different cities in Germany collaborated in these efforts. Her spouse was head doctor and was much harassed and fired several times because of his marriage. He was forced to guarantee that she would not meet his patients or live in his quarters; he was also accused of having allowed an unmarried pregnant woman to remain in his employ and of having given her his care. At one occasion, he asked them this directly: "Is this an attempt to separate me from my wife?" and was given the answer: "Yes, that is correct."

The police agent reported that she had few female friends, but many male ones, who often visited her and "had the appearance of democrats." She admitted to a police officer that she believed in democracy and republic: "At present, I view the cause of democracy to be lost. It would be madness to do anything now, but soon, there will be an opportunity to do so."

Her spouse had a wild rose carved upon her grave stone, and at his own, wrote, "The one God gave a woman, was given a treasure."

== Works ==
This list may be incomplete

- Wilde Rosen, 1846.
- Meine Emancipation, Verweisung und Rechtfertigung [My Emancipation, Reference and Justification], 1846.
- Aus dem Leben einer Frau, 1847.
- Lydia, 1848.
- India 1848.
- Revolution und Contrerevolution, 1849.
- Freischärler Reminiscenzen, 1850.
- Berlin am Abende des 12. November 1848, 1991.
- Lied einer schlesischen Weberin, 1991.

== See also ==
- Louise Otto-Peters
