= Johann Karl Christoph Nachtigal =

Title page of Otmar's Volkssagen (1800)

Johann Karl Christoph Nachtigal (25 February 1753, in Halberstadt – 21 June 1819, in Halberstadt) was a German Protestant theologian and philologist. His best-known publication is Peter the Goatherd; the folk tale became the model for Washington Irving's first short story Rip Van Winkle.

He studied philology and theology at the University of Halle, and afterwards worked as a schoolteacher at the Stephaneum in Halberstadt. In 1800 he was named school rector, and during the same time period, was appointed to the consistory. In 1802 he became ecclesiastical superintendent of the Principality of Halberstadt and the counties of Hohenstein and Mansfeld.

== Published works ==
- Zion; ältestes Drama aus der vorhomerischen Urwelt (1796) 'Zion; oldest drama from the pre-Homeric ancient world'
- Exegetisches handbuch des Alten Testaments für prediger, schullehrer und gebildete leser (1797) 'Exegetical handbook of the Old Testament for preachers, school teachers and educated readers'
- Gesänge Davids und seiner Zeitgenossen (1796) 'Songs of David and his contemporaries'
- Psalmen, gesungen (1797) 'Psalms, songs'
- Ruhestunden für Frohsinn und häusliches Glück, with Johann Gottfried Hoche (4 parts, 1798–1800) 'Hours of rest for cheerfulness and domestic happiness'
- Das Buch der Weisheit als Gegenstück der Koheleth (1799) 'The Book of Wisdom as a counterpart of Ecclesiastes'
- Volkssagen (1800) 'Folk tales'; published under the pseudonym "Otmar"
