= Peter Klaus =

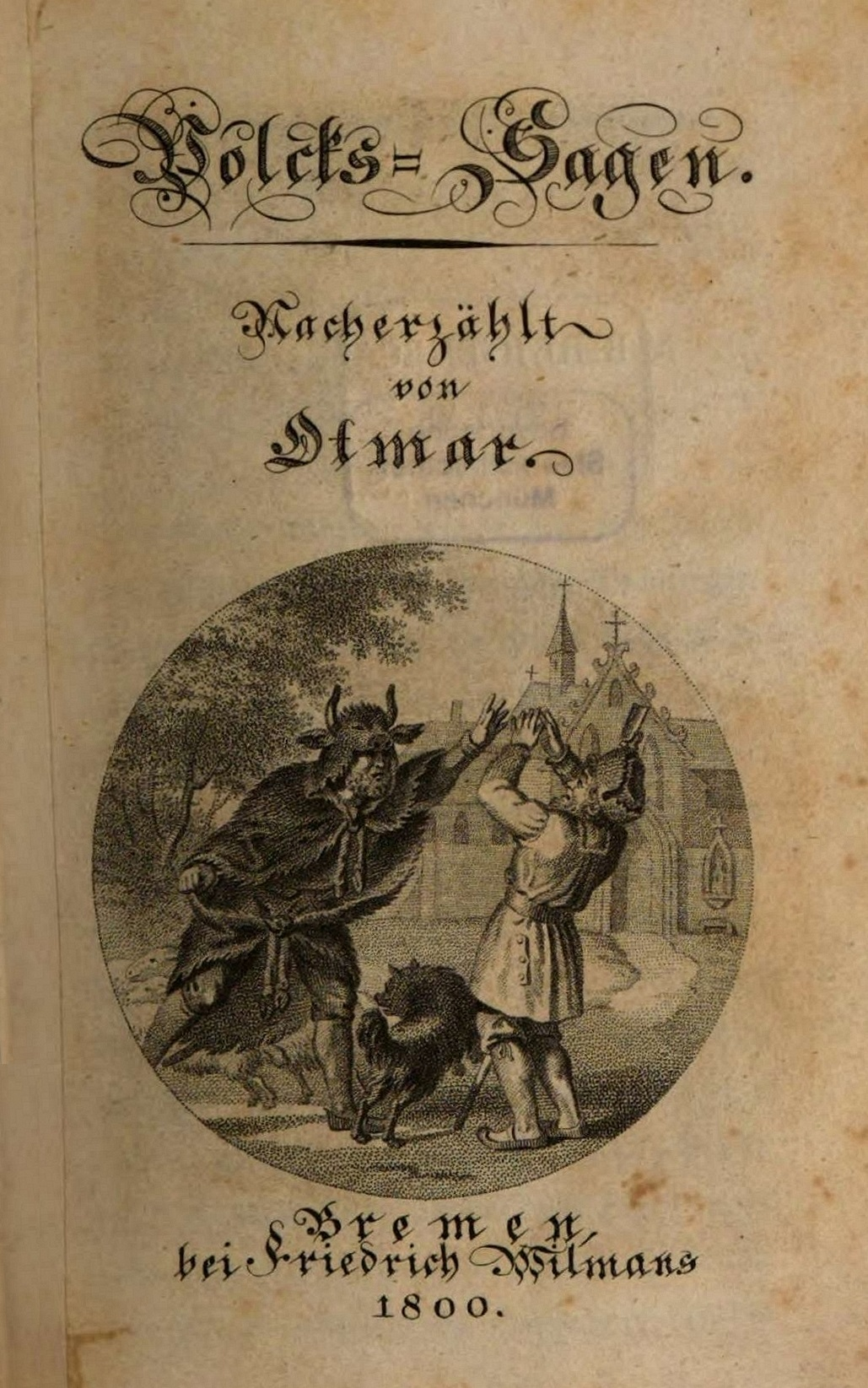
Cover of Nachtigal's Volcks-Sagen (1800)

"Peter Klaus" is a German folk tale. The story was written as "Der Ziegenhirt" ('The Goatherd') by Johann Karl Christoph Nachtigal, who published it in 1800 under the alias Otmar.

== Plot summary ==
The story follows a German goatherd from a village named Sittendorf, now part of the town Kelbra. While looking for escaped goats, Peter Klaus is led to a place where others are playing games in the woods. After tasting their wine, he falls asleep and wakes up twenty years later.

== Translations ==
"Der Ziegenhirt" has been translated into English a number of times:

- "Peter Klaus, the Goatherd" translated by Thomas Roscoe for The German Novelists (1826)
- "Peter the Goatherd" translated by Edgar Taylor for German Popular Stories volume 2 (1826) – one of only four stories in this book not by the Brothers Grimm
- "The Goatherd" translated by George Godfrey Cunningham for Foreign Tales and Traditions (1829) – translated via Johann Gustav Gottlieb Büsching's 1812 collection Volks-Sagen, Märchen und Legenden ('Folktales, Fairy Tales and Legends')
- "The Goatherd" translated by William John Thoms for The Original (1832) – also translated via Büsching's Volks-Sagen, Märchen und Legenden (1812)
- "Karl Katz" revised by Taylor from his earlier translation, for Gammer Grethel (1839) – the main character's name is changed from "Peter Klaus" to "Karl Katz"
- "The Goatherd" translated by Benjamin Thorpe for Yule-Tide Stories (1853)
- "Karl Katz" revised by Marian Edwardes from Taylor's "Karl Katz", for Grimm's Household Tales (1912)

== Influence ==
The story was part of the inspiration for American writer Washington Irving's 1819 short story "Rip Van Winkle".
