= Oto-hime =

Princess of the undersea palace Ryūgū-jō in the Japanese folktale Urashima Tarō

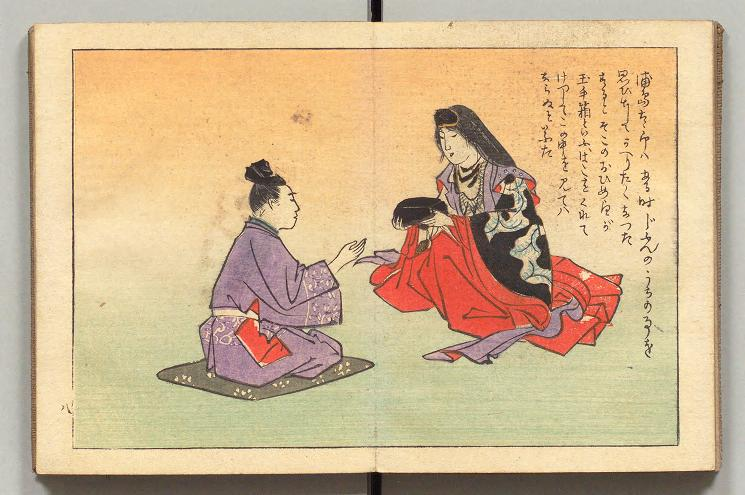
Oto-hime (right) gives the tamatebako to Urashima Tarō (Matsuki Heikichi, 1899)

Oto-hime or Otohime (Japanese: 乙姫), in the Japanese folktale of Urashima Tarō, is the princess of the undersea palace Ryūgū-jō.

== Second daughter ==
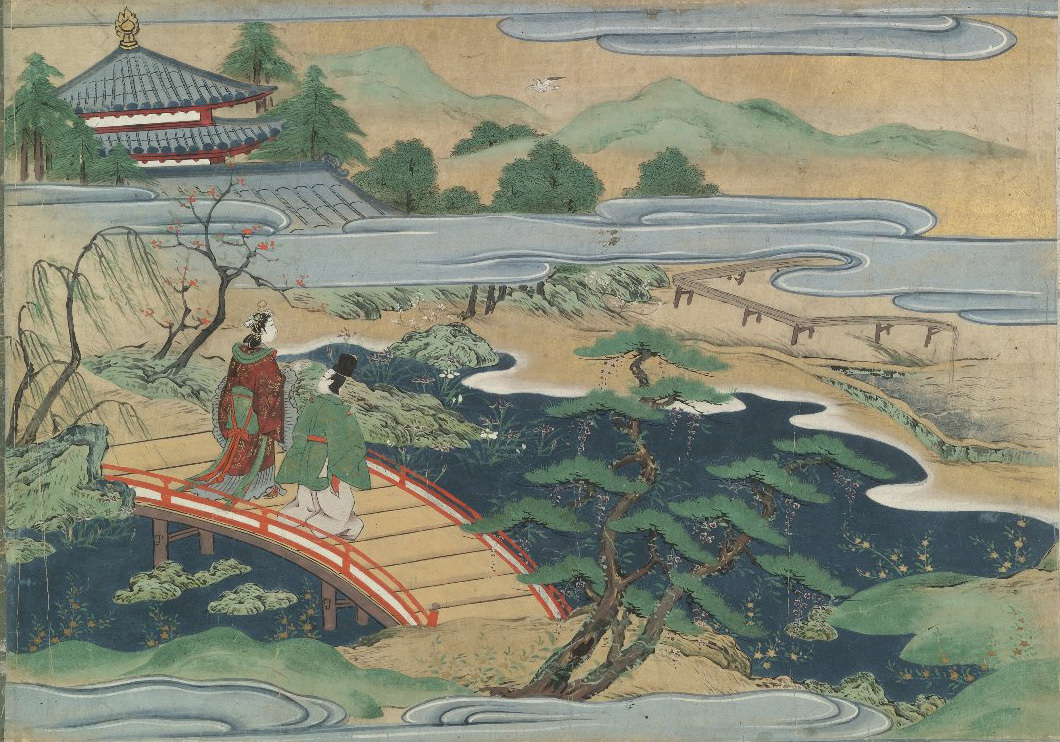
Urashima and Otohime cross a bridge in the kingdom under the sea. Japanese painting, late 16th or early 17th century

Oto-hime (Princess Oto)'s name consists of the character also read otsu meaning "No. 2". (Note: This is otsu as in the stock phrase kōotsu meaning "No. 1 and No. 2", as Miyao explains. Further explanation: kō and otsu are the first two of ten heavenly stems, which combined with the twelve earthly branches (Chinese zodiac) complete the Sexagenary cycle system. The kō can also be read as "ki-no-e", and otsu as "ki-no-to", literally "wood-elder" and "wood-younger"; thus each stem is a combo of the five elements and either yang/ying.) Thus Oto-hime must have been the 'second daughter' or 'younger princess' of the Dragon King (Ryū-ō), as explained by folklorist Yoshio Miyao in his bilingual edition of the In Urashima fairytale. Miyao whimsically wonders whatever became of Kō-hime, the elder daughter never mentioned.
