= Lanke (legend) =

Chinese legend

Lanke or Lankeshan (Chinese: 爛柯(山); pinyin: Lànkē(shan); Wade–Giles: Lan-k'o (Shan); trans. "(The Mountain of) the Rotten Axe Handle" in English), is a Chinese legend which has been compared to that of Rip Van Winkle, although it predates it by at least 1000 years.

The exact date of origin of the legend is unknown, but it has literary antecedents from the 5th century AD, and the "rotten axe handle" plot element was certainly present by an early 6th-century version.

One plot element of the legend features two Xian playing a board game, interpreted in later times as Go, so that Lanke (or Ranka in Japanese) has become a literary name for Go.

== The legend ==
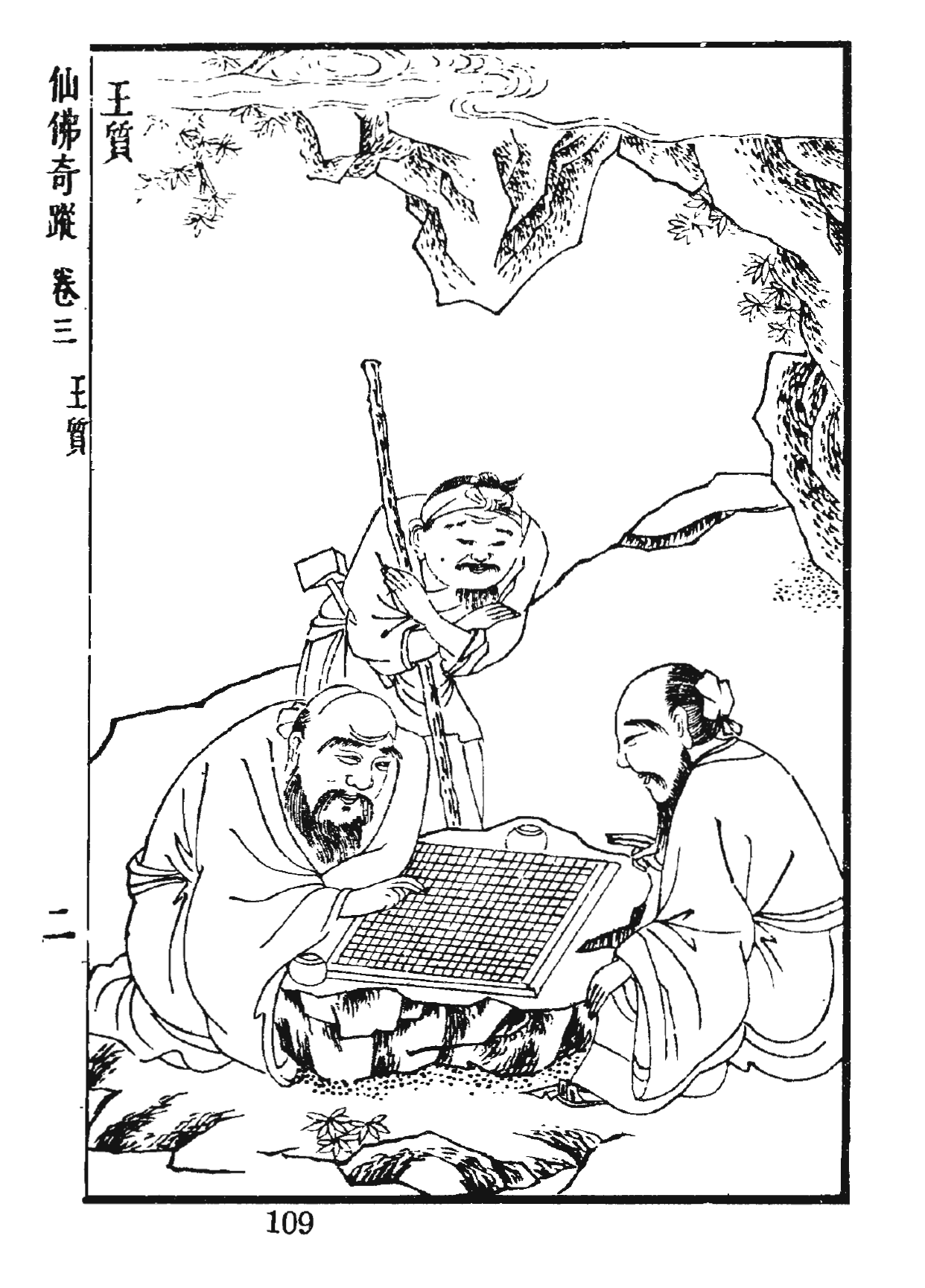

The legend is recorded in Ren Fang's Shuyiji or Tales of the Strange, and features a woodcutter, Wang Zhi or Wang Chih (王質; Wáng Zhì), and his encounter with the two Xian in the mountains. The story runs as follows:

Wang Zhi was a hardy young fellow who used to venture deep into the mountains to find suitable wood for his axe. One day he went farther than usual and became lost. He wandered about for a while and eventually came upon two strange old men who were playing Go, their board resting on a rock between them. Wang Zhi was fascinated. He put down his axe and began to watch. One of the players gave him something like a date to chew on, so that he felt neither hunger nor thirst. As he continued to watch he fell into a trance for what seemed like an hour or two. When he awoke, however, the two old men were no longer there. He found that his axe handle had rotted to dust and he had grown a long beard. When he returned to his native village he discovered that his family had disappeared and that no one even remembered his name.

== Lanke Mountain ==
Lanke Mountain, also known as Shishi ("Stone Room") Mountain or Shiqiao ("Stone Bridge") Mountain, is a hill located 10 km (6.2 mi) southeast of Quzhou city centre in Zhejiang, beside Wuxi River. The hilltop is 164 metres above sea level. The top of the hill features a rock formation in the form of a bridge. A cave is located under the bridge, which is said to be the location of the legend concerning Wang Zhi.

In religious Taoism, Lanke Mountain, as the abode of immortals, is identified as one of the 72 "blessed places".

== Literary evolution ==
The early 4th-century compilation of legends and occult tales Yiyuan (異苑) by official Liu Jingshu (劉敬叔) recorded a tale about a traveller riding a horse, who saw two elderly men by the side of the road playing shupu (樗蒲), a race game, and got off his horse to watch. In the middle of the game he glanced at his horse and was astonished to see that it had turned to a skeleton. When he returned home, he found that all of his family were gone.

The 4th-century Dongyang Ji (東陽記) by Zheng Qizhi recorded a slightly different version: a man named Wang Zhi went to Mount Shishi, in Zhejiang, to chop wood, and stopped when he heard four youths singing. The youths gave him food that looked like date cores. He ate them, and was not hungry. By the time the youths finished singing, and he started on his way home, he noticed that his axe handle had rotted. When he returned home, he realised that decades had past. The Dongyang Ji version was quoted by Li Daoyuan's influential 6th-century work Commentary on the Water Classic, which made the story famous.

Still later, 6th-century author Ren Fang's Shuyiji or Tales of the Strange reworked the story once again, so that the youths were playing a board game and singing, although he did not specifically mention Go.

The later versions of the story that identify two elders playing Go may also be influenced by the motif of immortals playing Go in other stories, such as the tale that appeared in Gan Bao's 4th-century compilation of supernatural stories In Search of the Supernatural, in which the gods Bei Dou (the Big Dipper) and Nan Dou (the corresponding stars in Sagittarius) were playing Go, when the youth Yan Chao approached them to ask for a longer life.

== Translations ==
- A version by Shin Kato (1942) which begins "Once upon a time a Chinese wood-cutter lost his way in a deep mountain."
- A version retold by Lionel Giles in A Gallery of Chinese Immortals (1948).

== Allusions ==
=== Poetic references ===
A poem by Tang dynasty poet Meng Jiao called The Stone Bridge of Lanke Mountain referenced the legend: "The path on which the wood chopper returned / the rotten axe handle goes with the wind / only the stone bridge remains / to ride above the red rainbow

A slightly later literary reference is a poem written in 900 by the Japanese poet and court official Ki no Tomonori upon returning to Japan from China:

furusato wa
mishi goto mo arazu
ono no e no
kuchishi tokoro zo
koishikarikeru

Here in my hometown
things are not as I knew them.
How I long to be
in the place where the axe shaft
moldered away into dust.

=== In Go ===
Later generations interpreted the game that the immortals were playing in the legend as Go. As a result, Lanke, or Ranka as pronounced in Japanese, became a literary name for Go.

=== Similar legends ===
Oware is a board game that has a similar legend, from which the game derives its name.

== See also ==
- Chinese mythology in popular culture
- Go
- History of Go
- Chinese mythology
