= The Devotions =

American doo-wop group

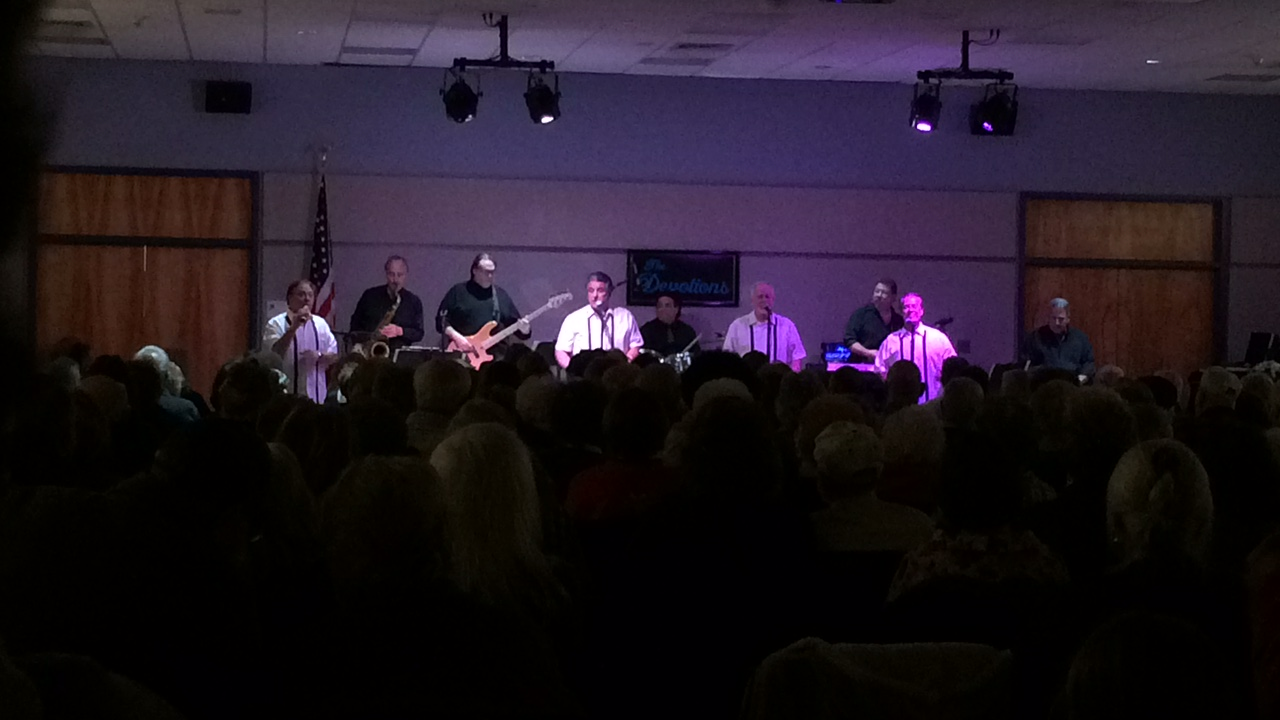
- The Devotions performing in 2016

Background information
- Origin: Astoria, Queens, New York
- Genres: Doo wop
- Years active: 1960–present
- Website: www.thedevotions.net

The Devotions are an American doo-wop group. Their single of a novelty song called "Rip Van Winkle" was released in 1961 on Delta Records; the tune was re-released on Roulette Records in 1962 and again on Roulette in 1963. The song became a hit on its third release, peaking as high as No. 36 on the Billboard Hot 100 in 1964.

== Members ==
- Bob Weisbrod
- Ray Sanchez
- Andy Sanchez
- Bob Hovorka
- Frank Pardo
- Joe Pardo
- Eugene McCaffery
- Daniel DeMauro
- Joe Del Pizzo
- Al Vieco
- Joe Spano
- Phil Russo
- Joe Spano
