= Ryūgū-jō =

Undersea palace of Ryūjin in Japanese folklore

Ryūgū-jō (竜宮城, 龍宮城; lit. "Dragon Palace Castle") or Ryūgū (竜宮, 龍宮; lit. "Dragon Palace") is the supernatural undersea palace of Ryūjin or Dragon God in Japanese tradition.

It is best known as the place in fairytale where Urashima Tarō was invited after saving a turtle, where he was entertained by the Dragon God's princess Oto-hime and his minions. When Urashima returned to land after what he thought was a few days away, centuries had passed.

== Overview ==
Ryūgū or Ryūgū-jō is the fabulous mythical residence of the Ryūjin (Dragon God) or Sea God, or the princess Otohime. It is also equated with the "fish-scale palace" (iroko no goto tsukureru miya) which was the Sea God Watatsumi's palace mentioned in the Kojiki (8th century).

The Ryūgū is well-known as the supernatural place in the fisherman's fairytale Urashima Tarō, and most Japanese now consider it to be a place which is supposed to lie under the sea. Actually, Ryūgū that appears in other narratives and fairytales (otogi banashi) had been considered to be underwater for a long time, but in the particular case of the Urashima legend, its Dragon Palace was not firmly considered to be underwater until quite late in the modern period.

== Urashima ==
=== Afloat or undersea ===
In most familiar versions of the Urashima legend nowadays in Japan, the Ryūgū lies undersea, but in early and otogizoshi versions, (Note: Tango hudoki or Tango fudoki. Cf. Urashima Tarō#Tango Fudoki) the fisherman traveled to Hōrai (Mount Penglai, the Elysium in Chinese tradition), a floating island. During the Edo era, pictorial depiction of Ryūgū above the waves remained fairly conventional. (Note: Hayashi (2001). Rigorously speaking, Hayashi stated that there are depictions of the turtles being standup ridden, and many of these feature the Ryūgū shown above the waves.) A work may illustrate Ryūgū above water, yet describe it textually as underwater, as in a burlesque gesaku work of 1782. (Note: Mukashi banashi tonda momotarō (昔噺虚言桃太郎; Tenmei 2/1782) by Iba Kashō 伊庭可笑; Torii Kiyonaga (illustr.). This is far from standard Urashima narrative since Momotaro substitutes in the role of Urashima, but at fol. 5v, the Mendacious Momotaro with "Momo" printed on his sleeve "rides the turtle 亀にうちのり" to go to Ryūgū (the palace is illustrated as above water), and the Dragon Palace's first daughter named Otome (fol. 6r) subsequently at 竜宮にいき（絵の竜宮は波の上）、竜宮の一人娘の乙女（6葉表）は、fol. 11r stands on the turtle's back, and "in the fashion of a female version of Daruma riding the reed leaf, hurries to the depths of the sea floor 女の葦の葉達磨といふ身振りにて海底深く急ぎ行く" (Hayashi (2001), p. 42).)

In the Meiji era, akahon ehon or "redbook picture books" of the 1880s, (Note: Akahon ehon texts, (1880s), critical text based on A B C texts; and on a b c d e f g texts.) as well as Tsukioka Yoshitoshi's (1886) print are examples of Ryūgū illustrated above water, but they are lacking in textual detail on whether it is a sunken city or not. The akahon illustrations were appropriated by Masayuki Kataoka's English translation (1886), which describes the Dragon Palace as visible "far below" the water, to which the man carried by the reptile "descended".

Ryūgū was described as a "Dragon Palace beyond the blue sea", in Basil Hall Chamberlain's translation (1886). Here the "Dragon Palace" is illustrated as a complex of buildings atop an island, with fishes clad in kimono walking about the sandy shore. Chamberlain had freely substituted more ancient text material into his retelling of the Urashima fairytale. Chamberlain also interchangeably uses "Sea God's Palace", probably with the archaic god-name Watatsumi in mind. (Note: Ozaki's translation, p. 30, says the palace is also called "Rin Gin", but this seems to be an insertion or substitution where the Japanese text only says "Ryūgū".)

Eventually, the Dragon Palace undersea became the standard in modern tellings of the Urashima tale. A canonical example by the Taisho Era, according to one researcher, was the edition by Mori Rintarō (novelist Mori Ōgai) and others, published 1920–1921, whose illustration shows Urashima and the turtle peeing underneath at the palace.

=== Palace architecture ===
"The walls of the Palace were of coral, the trees had emeralds for leaves and rubies for berries" (Chamberlain), (Note: The emeralds would be suigyoku (翠玉) and rubies are kōgyoku (紅玉) in Japanese.) roughly coincides with the inner chambers being fashioned with sangoju kin no tagui (珊樹樹金の類; lit. 'treelike coral, gold, and the like') according to Meiji Era akahon ehon ("red book" editions). (Note: Hayashi (2009), pp. 84–85. A critical text based on the A, B, C printed editions of 1880, 1883, and 1885 (these are woodblock-printed in hentaigana of the Edo Period). The latest C text is the base text. Updated based on a b c d e f g texts.)

The use of materials such as pearl or crystal on the exterior is given in Brauns' translation (Englished by Lang), alongside the interior hall being illuminated by fish scales.

Masayuki Kataoka's English translation (1886) describes a Dragon's Palace with a crystal dome, which a researcher considers a novel, unfamiliar feature. (Note: The researcher Hayashi apparently assumes "crystal" the mineral, but it can also be manufactured glass, of course. And glass (Japanese: hari) does feature in the Dragon Palace in some old narratives or play scripts.) Kataoka's translation, upon comparison, differed greatly from the text of the akahon picture books, though he had blatantly appropriated and reworked their illustrations. Here, there is a long distance from the gatekeeper to the palace proper, and Urashima is guided by a pretty glass ball that rolls of is own accord.

=== Four seasons on four sides ===
A notable feature of the Dragon Palace according to the "feudal" (otogizōshi) versions is the view to the "four seasons on four sides", (Note: The standard text is the Shibukawa text, which is given by Yoshida. The Bodleian picture scroll text has also been transcribed by Hayashi.) though this has been eschewed in Chamberlain's translation. (Note: Makino remarks that certain minor details from otogizōshi are incorporated in Chamberlain's text.)

However, the view to the four seasons is incorporated in Mrs. Ozaki's translation: cherry blossom in bloom to the east (spring), buzzing cicadas to the south (summer), multi-colored maple leaves to the west (autumn), and snow-covered ground to the north (winter). This is presumably based on a text edited by Iwaya Sazanami, probably the text of Nihon mukashibanashi (1896), which corresponds roughly with a version from the Otogizōshi. The four seasons also figure in F. Hadland Davis's synopsis (1912). The usual bird which sings in spring is the bush warbler, not actually a nightingale. More precise translations from the otogizōshi text are given elsewhere.

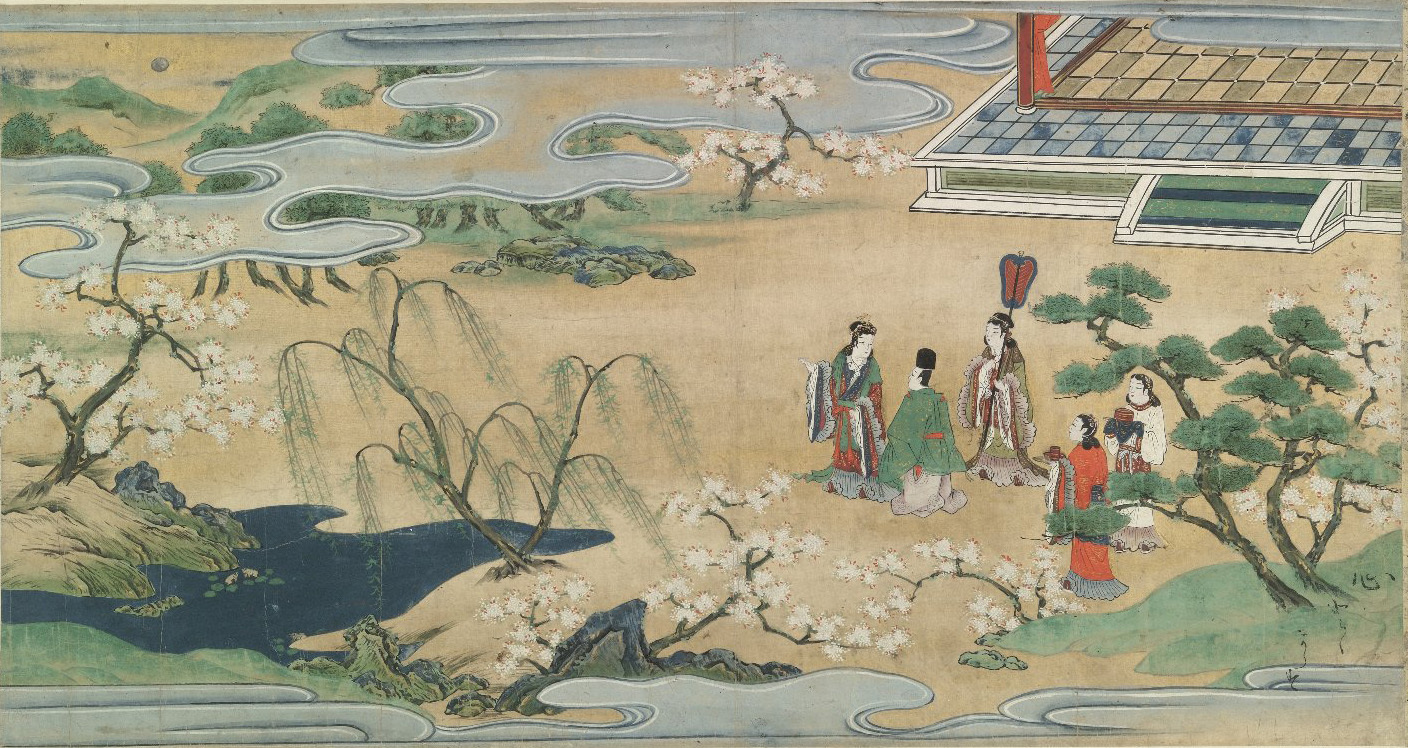
The Spring side of the palace, cherry blossoms on the trees

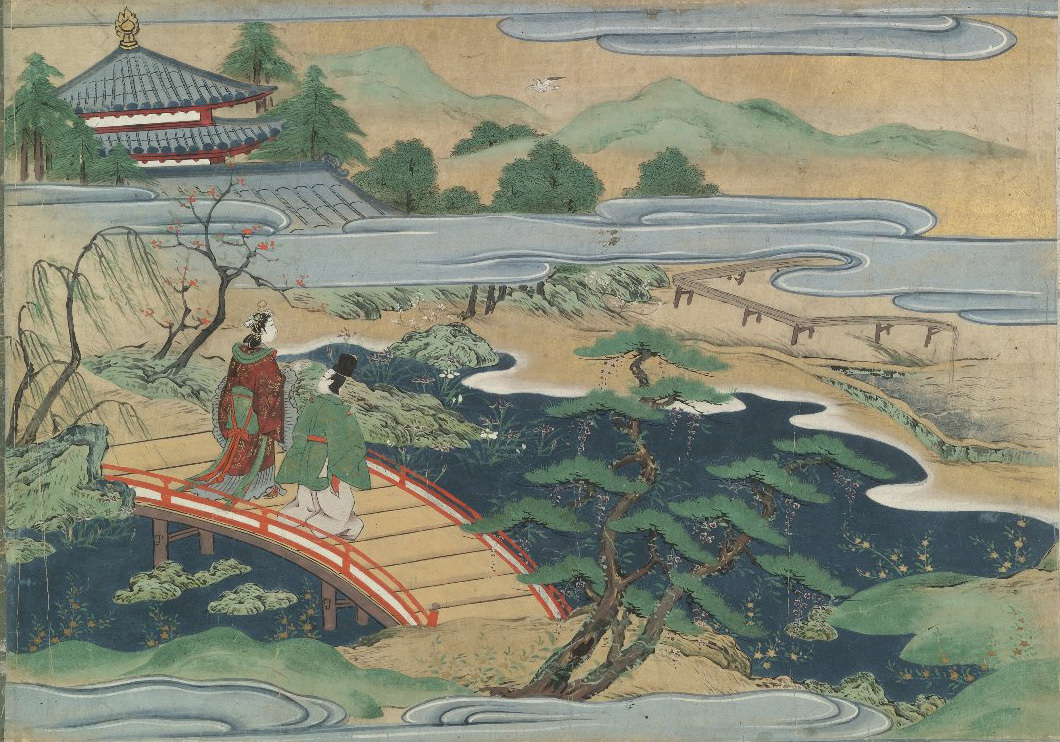
The Summer side of the palace, Urashima and Otohime walking on a bridge

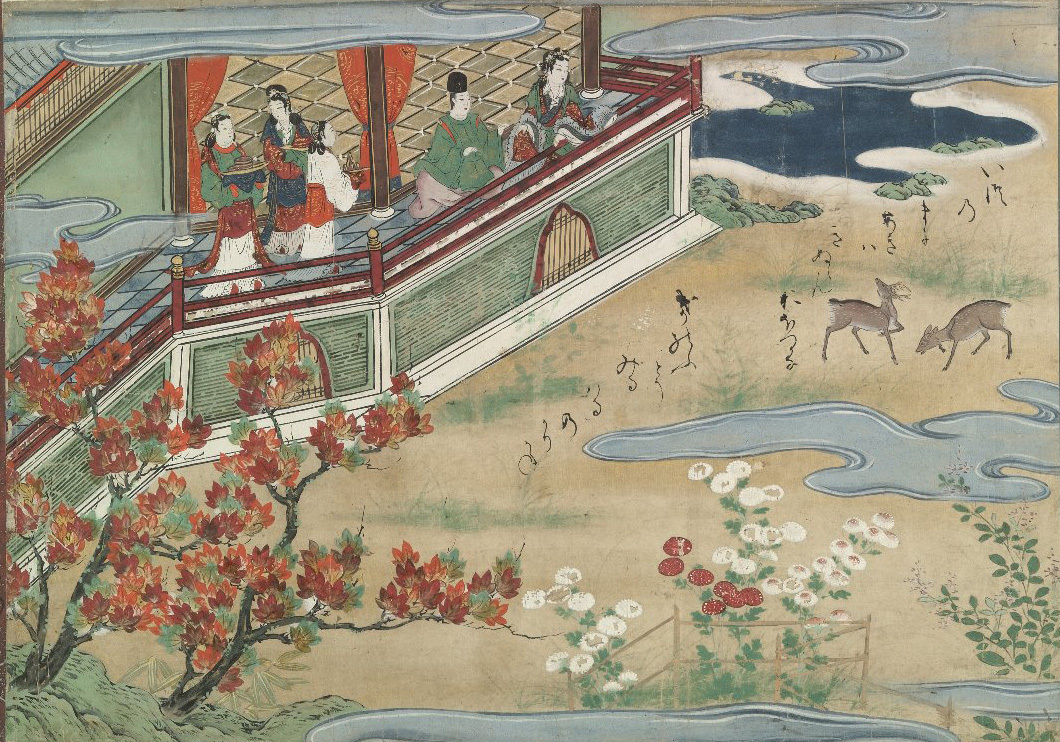
The Autumn side of the palace, Urashima and Otohime watching deer

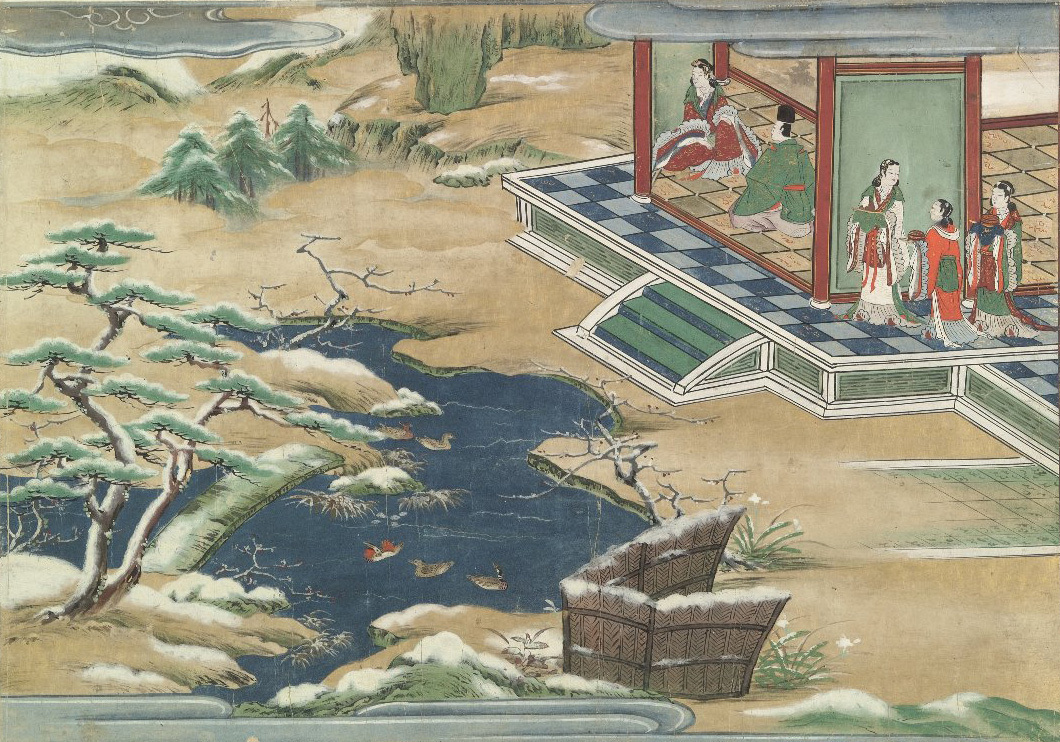
The Winter side of the palace, with a light snow on the garden

Japanese watercolor from late 16th or early 17th century

=== Passage of time ===
Whether in the ancient (Nara Period), (Note: Tango fudoki fragment, 3 years had elapsed at Sento (仙都; "immortal city"), and Urashimako upon return is told 300 years had gone by.) feudal period or standard modern versions of Urashima, he believes he has spent 3 years at the otherworld or Dragon Palace, but more than 300 years had elapsed in the ancient and standard modern versions (700 years in the feudal period versions). The Mizukagami (1195) gives a more precise reckoning; Urashima supposedly returned in the 2nd year of Tenchō (825 AD), 347 years later. This matches the claim in Nihon shoki that he disappeared in the year of Yuraku 22, conventionally assigned the year 478. But it also means he did not come back until a century after the Nihon shoki was written.

== Hoderi and Hoori ==
In the mythology concerning the two princes Hoderi ("Fire Flash") and Hoori ("Fire Fade") in the Kojiki, the latter younger brother ventures to the Sea God's palace and emerges triumphant, and sires the line of emperors. The story has been often retold as fairytale, e.g. as "The Princes Fire-flash & Fire-fade".

The Sea-God's palace, a "palace built like fishes' scales", is interpreted to be a metaphor for a silver-colored structure.

== Local lore ==
In the Ryukyuan religion, Ryūgū-jō (Okinawan: Ruuguu) is the source of fire for all family and village hearths.

== Ryūgū-no-tsukai and Jinjahime ==
The Japanese name for the deep-sea dwelling giant oarfish is ryūgū-no-tsukai (リュウグウノツカイ), literally lit. "messenger/servant of Ryūgū" or "Messenger from the Sea God's Palace".

This real species of fish may have been the origins of the mythical jinjahime, which also claimed to be a "messenger/servant of Ryūgū". (Note: The jinjahime is also mentioned in connection with the iconic amabie bearing resemblance to oarfish.) This (神社姫; lit. 'shrine princess'), was a type of the so-called "prophet beast" (yogenjū) during the Edo period, which prophesied bountiful harvest followed by epidemic.

== Monuments ==
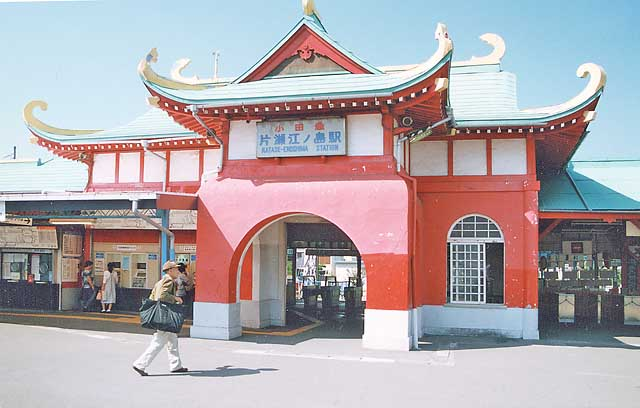
Katase-Enoshima Station

The Katase-Enoshima Station in Fujisawa, Kanagawa Prefecture is a structure built to resemble Ryūgū-jō, as a mock-up.

Ryūgū Shrine derives its name from Ryūgū-jō. Located on Cape Nagasakibana (also known as Cape Ryūgū) in southern Kagoshima, it is said to be where Urashima Tarō traveled to Ryūgū-jō. Locals honor Ryūjin and turtles as protectors.

== See also ==
- 162173 Ryugu, an asteroid named after Ryūgū-jō
- Eglė the Queen of Serpents
- Ryugu Planitia, a smooth plain on Triton
- The Sea King and Vasilisa the Wise
- The Wife from the Dragon Palace
