= Rip Van Winkle =

1819 short story by Washington Irving

- Short story by Washington Irving
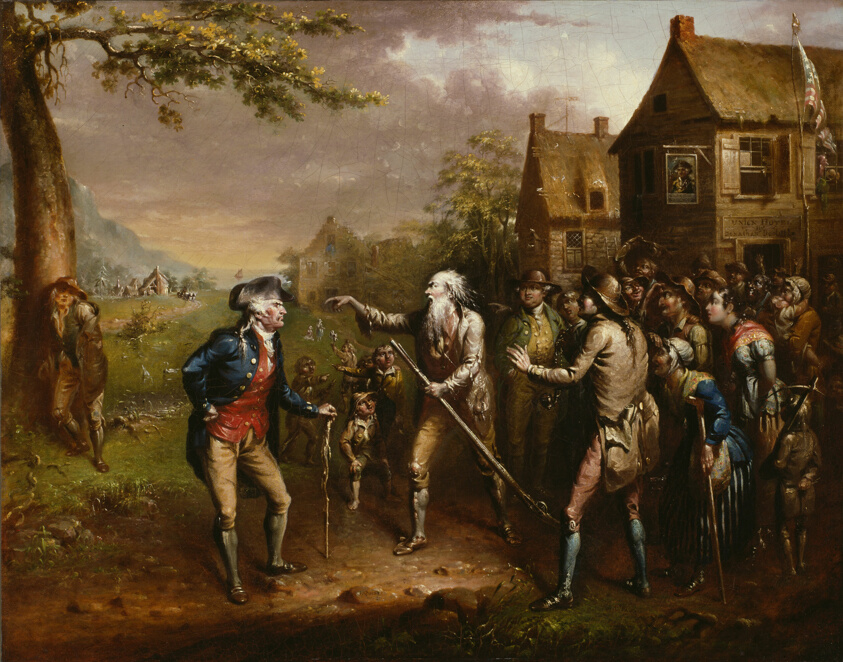
- Depiction of Rip Van Winkle by John Quidor (1829). Housed at Art Institute of Chicago.

Text available at Wikisource
- Language: English
- Genre: Short story

Publication
- Published in: The Sketch Book of Geoffrey Crayon, Gent.
- Publication date: 1819

"Rip Van Winkle" (Dutch pronunciation: [ˈrɪp fɑn ˈʋɪŋkəl]) is a short story by the American author Washington Irving, first published in 1819. It follows a Dutch-American villager in colonial America named Rip Van Winkle who meets mysterious Dutchmen, imbibes their strong liquor and falls deeply asleep in the Catskill Mountains. He awakes 20 years later to a very changed world, having missed the American Revolution.

Inspired by a conversation on nostalgia with his American immigrant brother-in-law, Irving wrote the story while temporarily living in Birmingham, England. It was published in his collection, The Sketch Book of Geoffrey Crayon, Gent. While the story is set in New York's Catskill Mountains near where Irving later took up residence, he admitted, "When I wrote the story, I had never been on the Catskills."

== Plot summary ==
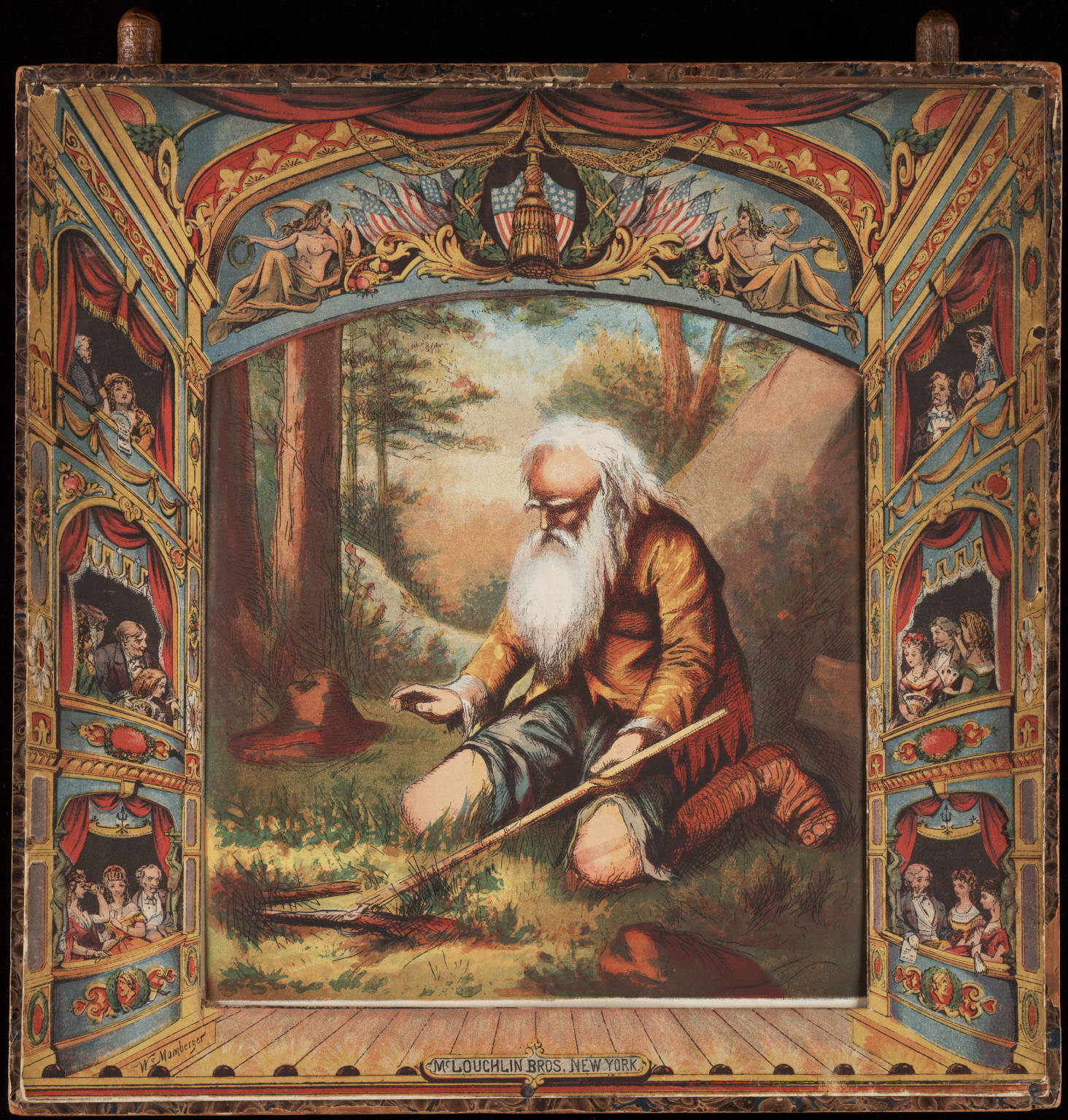
c. 1875 illustration of Rip Van Winkle by Thomas Nast

Rip Van Winkle, a Dutch American man with a habit of avoiding useful work, lives in a village at the foot of the Catskill Mountains in the years before the American Revolution. One day, he goes squirrel hunting in the mountains with his dog, Wolf, to escape his wife's irritation. As evening falls, he hears a voice calling his name and finds a man dressed in old-fashioned Dutch clothing and carrying a keg. Rip helps the man carry his burden to a cleft in the rocks from which thunderous noises are emanating; the source proves to be a group of bearded men wearing similar outfits and playing ninepins. Not asking who these men are or how they know his name, Rip joins them in drinking from the keg he has helped carry and soon becomes so drunk that he falls asleep.

Rip awakens on a sunny morning, at the spot where he first saw the keg-carrier, and finds that many drastic changes have occurred; his beard is a foot long and has turned grey, his musket is badly deteriorated, and Wolf is nowhere to be found. Returning to his village, he discovers it to be larger than he remembers and filled with people in unfamiliar clothing, none of whom recognize him. When asked how he voted in the election that has just been held, he declares himself a loyal subject of George III, unaware that the American Revolutionary War has taken place in his absence. He learns that many of his old friends either were killed in the war or have left the village, and is disturbed to find a young man who shares his name, mannerisms, and younger appearance. A young woman states that her father is Rip Van Winkle, who has been missing for 20 years, and an old woman recognises him as Rip. The young woman and the young Rip are his children, and the former has named her infant son after him as well.

Rip discovers that his wife has been dead for some time but is not saddened by the news. He learns via a village elder that the men he met in the mountains are said to be ghosts of the crew of the Dutch East India Company ship Halve Maen. His daughter takes him into her home, and he soon resumes his usual idleness (unconcerned by the major political changes during his slumber) and begins telling his story to every stranger who visits the village. The tale is solemnly taken to heart (despite some assuming him to be insane) by the settlers, particularly by the old Dutch inhabitants who say that, whenever thunder is heard, the men in the mountains must be playing ninepins.

== Characters ==
- Rip Van Winkle – A henpecked husband with an aversion to "profitable labour" and a meek, easygoing resident of the village who wanders off to the mountains and meets strange men playing ninepins
- Dame Van Winkle – Rip Van Winkle's cantankerous and nagging wife
- Rip Van Winkle Jr. – Rip Van Winkle's ne'er-do-well son
- Judith Gardenier – Rip Van Winkle's married daughter; she takes her father in after he returns from his sleep.
- Derrick Van Bummel – The local schoolmaster who went on to serve in the American Revolution as a flag officer and later a member of Congress
- Nicolaus Vedder – Landlord of the local inn where menfolk congregate
- Dominie Van Schaick – The local parson
- Jonathan Doolittle – Owner of the Union Hotel, the establishment that replaced the village inn
- Wolf – Van Winkle's faithful dog
- Man carrying a keg up the mountain – The ghost of one of Henry Hudson's crew members
- Ninepin bowlers – The ghosts of Henry Hudson's crewmen from his ship, the Half-Moon; they share their liquor with Rip Van Winkle and play a game of ninepins.
- Brom Dutcher – Van Winkle's neighbor who went off to war while Van Winkle was sleeping
- Old woman – Woman who identifies Van Winkle when he returns to the village after his sleep
- Peter Vanderdonck – The oldest resident of the village, who confirms Van Winkle's identity and cites evidence indicating Van Winkle's strange tale is true
- Mr. Gardenier – Judith Gardenier's husband, a farmer
- Baby Rip – Judith Gardenier's infant son and Van Winkle's grandson

== Composition and publication history ==
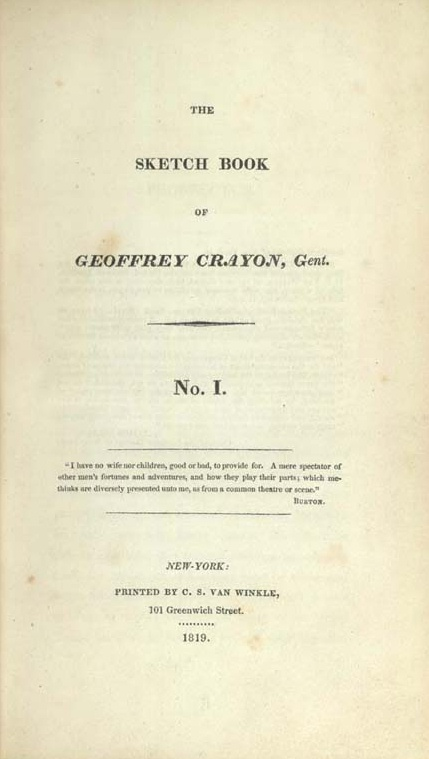
The first installment of The Sketch Book of Geoffrey Crayon, Gent. (1819) included "Rip Van Winkle".

After a failed business venture with his brothers, Irving filed for bankruptcy in 1818. Despondent, he turned to writing for possible financial support, although he had difficulty thinking of stories to write. He stayed in Birmingham, England, where his brother-in-law Henry van Wart had opened a trading firm. The two were reminiscing in June 1818 when Irving was suddenly inspired by their nostalgic conversation. Irving locked himself in his room and wrote nonstop all night. As he said, he felt like a man waking from a long sleep. He presented the first draft of "Rip Van Winkle" to the van Wart family over breakfast.

"Rip Van Winkle" was one of the first stories Irving proposed for his new book The Sketch Book of Geoffrey Crayon, Gent. Irving asked his brother Ebenezer to assist with publication in the United States. As Irving wrote, "I shall feel very anxious to hear of the success of this first re-appearance on the literary stage – Should it be successful, I trust I shall be able henceforth to keep up an occasional fire." A British edition was published shortly afterward, by John Miller, who went out of business immediately thereafter. With help from his friend Walter Scott, Irving was able to convince John Murray to take over British publication of the Sketch Book.

Following the success of "Rip Van Winkle" in print and onstage, later celebrated editions were illustrated by Arthur Rackham (Heinemann, 1905) and N.C. Wyeth (McKay, 1921).

== Themes and literary forerunners ==
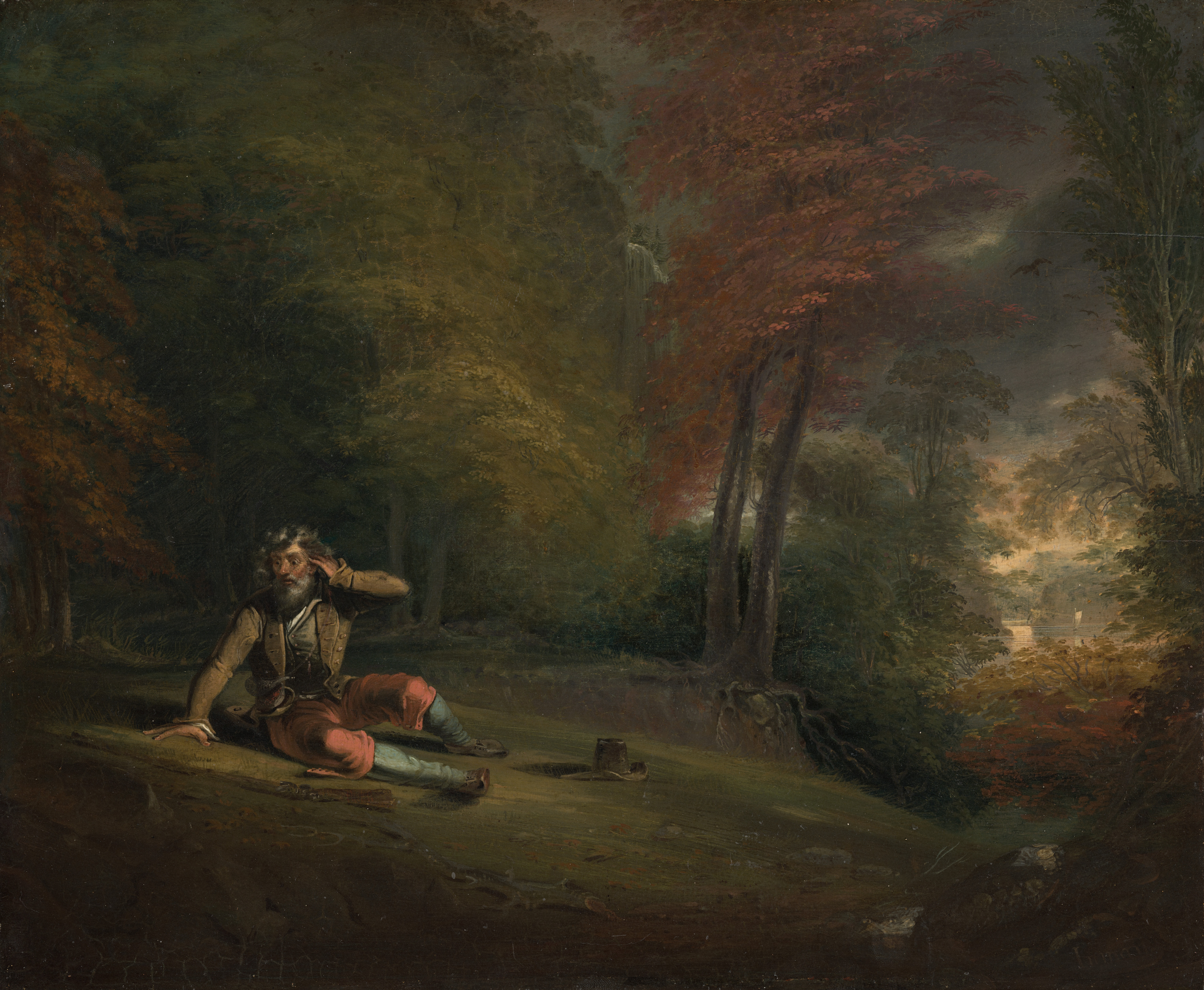
Rip Van Winkle Awakening from His Long Sleep by Henry Inman, 1823

The story of "Rip Van Winkle" itself is widely thought to have been based on Johann Karl Christoph Nachtigal's German folktale "Peter Klaus", which is a shorter story set in a German village. It tells of a goatherd named Peter Klaus who goes looking for a lost goat. He finds some men drinking in the woods and after drinking some of their wine, falls asleep. When he wakes up, twenty years have passed.

The story also bears some similarities to stories from East Asia, including the third-century AD Chinese tale of "Ranka", as retold by Lionel Giles in A Gallery of Chinese Immortals, and the eighth-century Japanese tale "Urashima Tarō". The Hindu story of Muchukunda from the Bhagavata Purana also displays many similarities to the story of "Rip Van Winkle".

In Christian tradition, there is a similar, well-known story of "The Seven Sleepers of Ephesus", which recounts a group of early Christians who hid in a cave circa 250 AD to escape the persecution of Christians during the reign of the Roman emperor Decius. They fell into a miraculous sleep and woke some 200 years later during the reign of Theodosius II to discover that the city and the whole Empire had become Christian. This Christian story is recounted by Islam and appears in a famous Sura of the Quran, Sura Al-Kahf. The version recalls a group of young monotheists escaping from persecution within a cave and emerging hundreds of years later.

One story in Judaism concerns Honi HaMe'agel, a miracle-working sage of the 1st century BC, who was a historical character but to whom various myths were attached. While traveling one day, Honi saw a man planting a carob tree and asked him about it. The man explained that the tree would take 70 years to bear fruit and that he was planting it not for himself but for the generations to follow him. Later that day, Honi sat down to rest but fell asleep for 70 years; when he awoke, he saw a man picking fruit from a fully mature carob tree. Asked whether he had planted it, the man replied that he had not but that his grandfather had planted it for him.

Another similar story in the Islamic tradition is of Uzair (usually identified with the Biblical Ezra), whose grief at the Destruction of Jerusalem by the Babylonians was so great that God took his soul and brought him back to life after Jerusalem was reconstructed. He rode on his revived donkey and entered his native place. But the people did not recognize him, nor did his household, except the maid, who was now an old blind woman. He prayed to God to cure her blindness, and she could see again. He meets his son, who recognizes him by a mole between his shoulders and is older than he was. (see Uzair § Islamic tradition and literature).

Albert Einstein's theory of relativity, under which a person traveling at near light speed would experience only the passage of a few years but would return to find centuries had passed on Earth, provides a broad new scope to express essentially the same literary theme – for example, in the opening chapter of Ursula K. Le Guin's Rocannon's World. In Robert Heinlein's Time for the Stars, Earth sends out a fleet of relativistic ships to explore the galaxy, their crews hailed as stalwart pioneers – but after a century, which they experience as only a few years, faster-than-light ships are developed and the earlier ones are recalled, their crews discovering that they had become unwanted anachronisms on a changed Earth. The protagonist notices a newspaper headline disparagingly announcing the arrival of himself and his shipmates as "yet another crew of Rip Van Winkles".

In the tenth chapter of his book Lives and Opinions of Eminent Philosophers, the third-century AD Greek historian Diogenes Laërtius relates the story of the legendary sage Epimenides of Knossos, who was said to have been a shepherd on the island of Crete. One day, Epimenides followed after a sheep that had wandered off and after becoming tired, went into a cave under Mount Ida and fell asleep. When he awoke, he continued searching for the sheep but could not find it, so he returned to his father's farm, only to discover that it was under new ownership. He went home, only to discover that the people there did not know him. Finally, he encountered his younger brother, who had become an old man, and learned that he had been asleep in the cave for fifty-seven years. According to the different sources that Diogenes relates, Epimenides lived to be 154, 157, or 299 years old. Multiple sources have identified the story of Epimenides as the earliest known variant of the "Rip Van Winkle" fairy tale.

The theme is taken up in numerous modern works of science fiction. In H. G. Wells's The Sleeper Awakes, a man who sleeps for 203 years wakes up in a completely transformed London, where he has become the richest man in the world. In the original Buck Rogers book, the protagonist falls asleep under the influence of a gas in a mine, sleeps for four centuries, and wakes to find America under the rule of Mongol invaders – whereupon he places himself at the head of the freedom fighters. In Roger Zelazny's science-fantasy series The Chronicles of Amber, protagonist Corwyn experiences drinking and revelry in an underground lair with otherworldly people who try to entice him into slumber; he knows this is a centuries-of-sleep trap and resists; the passage is similar in theme to both "Rip Van Winkle" and especially the Orkney story. The movies Idiocracy and Time Trap also bear some similarities, as does the setup for the television show Futurama.

== Adaptations ==
The story has been adapted for other media over the past two centuries, in cartoons, films, stage plays, music, and other media.

- Theater:
  - Actor Joseph Jefferson performed various dramatizations of the character on the 19th-century stage.
  - In Chicago, the Sigman Brothers adapted the story to a full musical.
- Film:
  - Rip Van Winkle (1903 film)
  - Rip Van Winkle (1910 film)
  - Rip Van Winkle (1912 film)
  - Rip Van Winkle (1921 film)
- Music:
  - George Frederick Bristow's 1855 Rip van Winkle opera
  - The 1882 operetta Rip Van Winkle, a romantic opera adaptation
  - The 1901 novelty song "Rip Van Winkle Was a Lucky Man" composed by Jean Schwartz with lyrics by William Jerome
  - The 1960s Tale Spinners for Children includes a dramatization of the story.
  - The 1961–64 doo-wop single "Rip Van Winkle" by The Devotions
  - The 2006 song "Rip Van Winkle" by Doom metal band Witch
- Poetry: British poet laureate Carol Ann Duffy wrote "Mrs Rip Van Winkle" from the perspective of the wife, who in the original story is voiceless.
- Cartoons and animated films:
  - An episode of The Flintstones titled "Rip Van Flintstone" (aired November 5, 1965)
  - An episode of Garfield and Friends titled "Rip Van Kitty" (aired September 16, 1989)
  - An episode of the Laurel and Hardy cartoon series titled "Flipped Van Winkles"
  - Tales of Washington Irving, a one-hour animated television special about "The Legend of Sleepy Hollow" and "Rip Van Winkle"
  - In 1978, Will Vinton directed, produced and animated a 26-minute claymation short of the story, nominated for an Academy Award
- Comics
  - Disney's "Rip van Goofy" (February 1, 1966)
  - Boys' Life's Dink & Duff comic strip has Dink, an African-American Cub Scout, lapse into a coma and awaken in 2068. A boy addresses him as "Rip van Dinkle" and explains that during the past 80 years, the United States has been replaced by an authoritarian monarchy. Dink eventually awakens back in 1988.
- Public Readings
  - The Mountain Top Historical Society, located in Haines Falls, New York, holds an annual reading of the story in its historic 1913 Train Station. The historical society is located in Kaaterskill Clove in the Norther Catskill Mountains, the very place that is referenced in the story as the location where Rip fell asleep.
- Television
  - E. G. Marshall plays the title character in a 1958 episode of Shirley Temple's Storybook.
  - Wishbone shows the dog imagining himself as the title character, complete with the men playing ninepins and his mistaking the George Washington Inn for his old hangout, the King George Inn.

== Statue ==
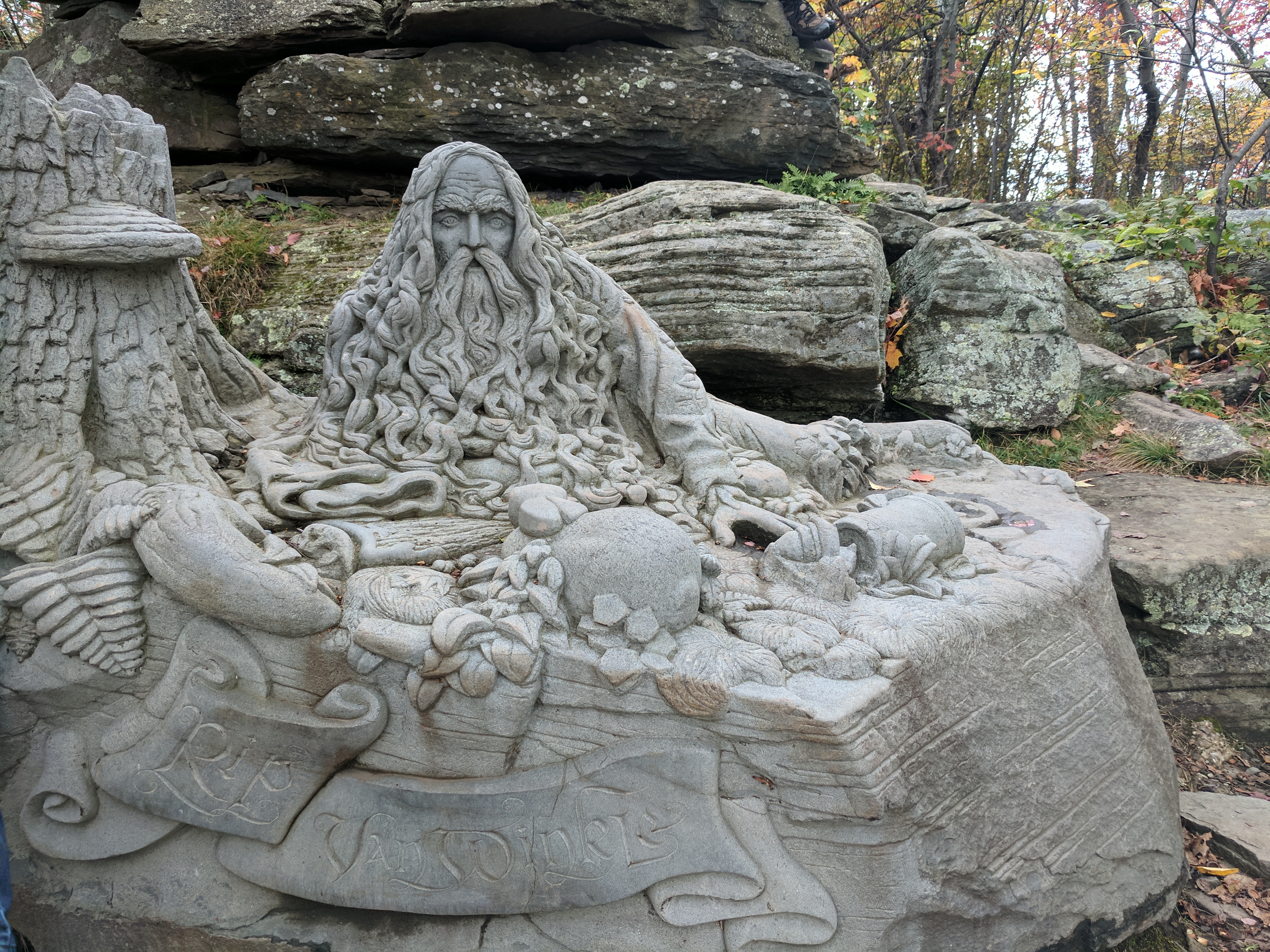
A sculpture of Rip Van Winkle located near the summit of Hunter Mountain Ski Resort

There is a statue of Rip Van Winkle in Irvington, New York.A sculpture of Rip Van Winkle can also be found near the summit of the Hunter Mountain Ski Resort in the Catskills. There is also a statue on Main Street in Catskill, NY.

== In popular culture ==
The name Rip Van Winkle has been used to name:

- Infrastructure (Rip Van Winkle Bridge)
- Consumer goods (Old Rip Van Winkle whiskey)
- Music:
  - American composer George Whitefield Chadwick wrote a concert overture titled Rip Van Winkle in 1879, when he was a student in Leipzig.
  - American doom metal band Witch performs a song titled "Rip Van Winkle" detailing the story in song form.
  - American doo-wop band The Devotions released their novelty single "Rip Van Winkle" in 1961 on Delta Records.
  - American psych-rock band Shannon and the Clams released a song called "Rip Van Winkle" on their third album, Dreams from the Rat House.
  - American alternative rock band Ween mentions Rip Van Winkle in numerous songs on their 1991 album The Pod, most notably the song "Sketches of Winkle".
  - David Bromberg, on his album “How Late'll Ya Play 'Til?” (Volume 2, Studio), puts the story to music in the song “Kaatskill Serenade”.
- Video games:
  - The 1990 video game Super Mario World features an enemy known as "Rip Van Fish", which constantly sleeps unless disturbed.
  - In the 2018 video game, Red Dead Redemption 2, one of the characters (John Marston) uses the name "Rip Van Winkle" when questioned by the authorities.
- Television:
  - In the 1961 The Twilight Zone episode "The Rip Van Winkle Caper", four gold thieves place themselves in suspended animation for 100 years to escape the law. Upon revival, they find one of them already dead. Two others die later, and the last man dies of thirst, offering his gold to a citizen in exchange for water. But he doesn't realize that, in the intervening years, gold became possible to manufacture and became practically worthless.
  - On the BBC television show Doctor Who, the tenth episode of the ninth series (titled "Sleep No More") involves a machine called Morpheus that can condense a full night's worth of sleep into mere minutes. People who refuse to use Morpheus are colloquially called "Rips", referencing Rip van Winkle.

== See also ==
- The Bedbug, the story of Prisypkin, who was frozen in the basement for fifty years.
- Cryonics
- Epimenides
- Rip Van Wink from The Beano
- Seven Sleepers, the Christian and Islamic story of a group of youths who hid inside a cave at Ephesus to escape Roman persecutions and emerged some 350 years later.
- Sleeping Beauty
- Niña de las Peras (Pear Girl), who disappeared, reappearing decades later with the same appearance she had on the day she disappeared.
- The Voyage of Bran, an Irish tale where Bran's crew return to Ireland only to find that many years have passed and they been long forgotten.
- Honi HaMe'agel
- Lanke
- Urashima Tarō
