= Azumi-no-isora =

Shinto kami of the seashore

Azumi-no-isora (阿曇磯良) is a Shinto kami of the seashore. He is considered to be the ancestor of the Azumi people. He is worshiped at a number of shrines, including Mekari Shrine (和布刈神社) of Kitakyushu, Shikaumi Shrine on Shika Island, and Shiga Shrine (志賀神社) of Tsushima.

Azumi-no-isora is considered a (lesser) sea deity hired as navigator to bring the emissary Takenouchi no Sukune to the Dragon King (i.e., Dragon God, Ryūjin) in the late legend regarding the loan of the tide jewels to Empress Jingū, attested in various foundation myth documents of the Hachiman cult. (Note: According to a certain source, Isora offered his navigational services in "exchange for a sexual relationship" with the empress. Though "the motif of divine union between Jingu and a sea god is relatively uncommon", the notion that Azumi-no-isora obtained sexual favors from the empress is attested in shrine-foundation myth (jisha engi) document called the Rokugō kaizan Ninmmon daibosatsu hongi (六郷開山仁聞大菩薩本紀). Other shrines of the cult do not promote this idea. Isora carries out the task "without any sexual compensation" in the Hachiman gudōkun attributed to a priest at the Iwashimizu Hachimangu.)
