= Japanese dragon =

Serpentine creature in Japanese mythology

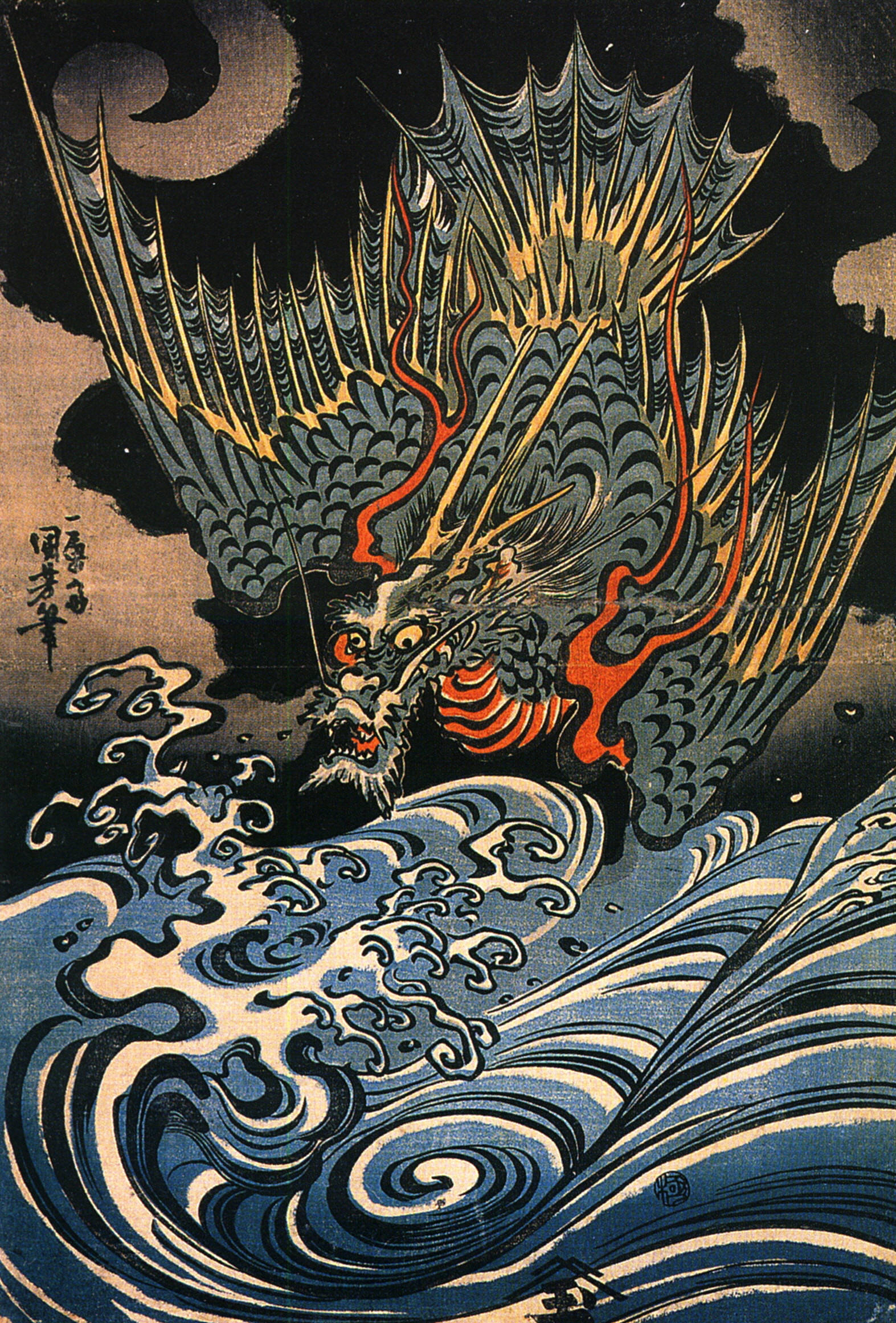
Japanese sea-dragon, by Utagawa Kuniyoshi

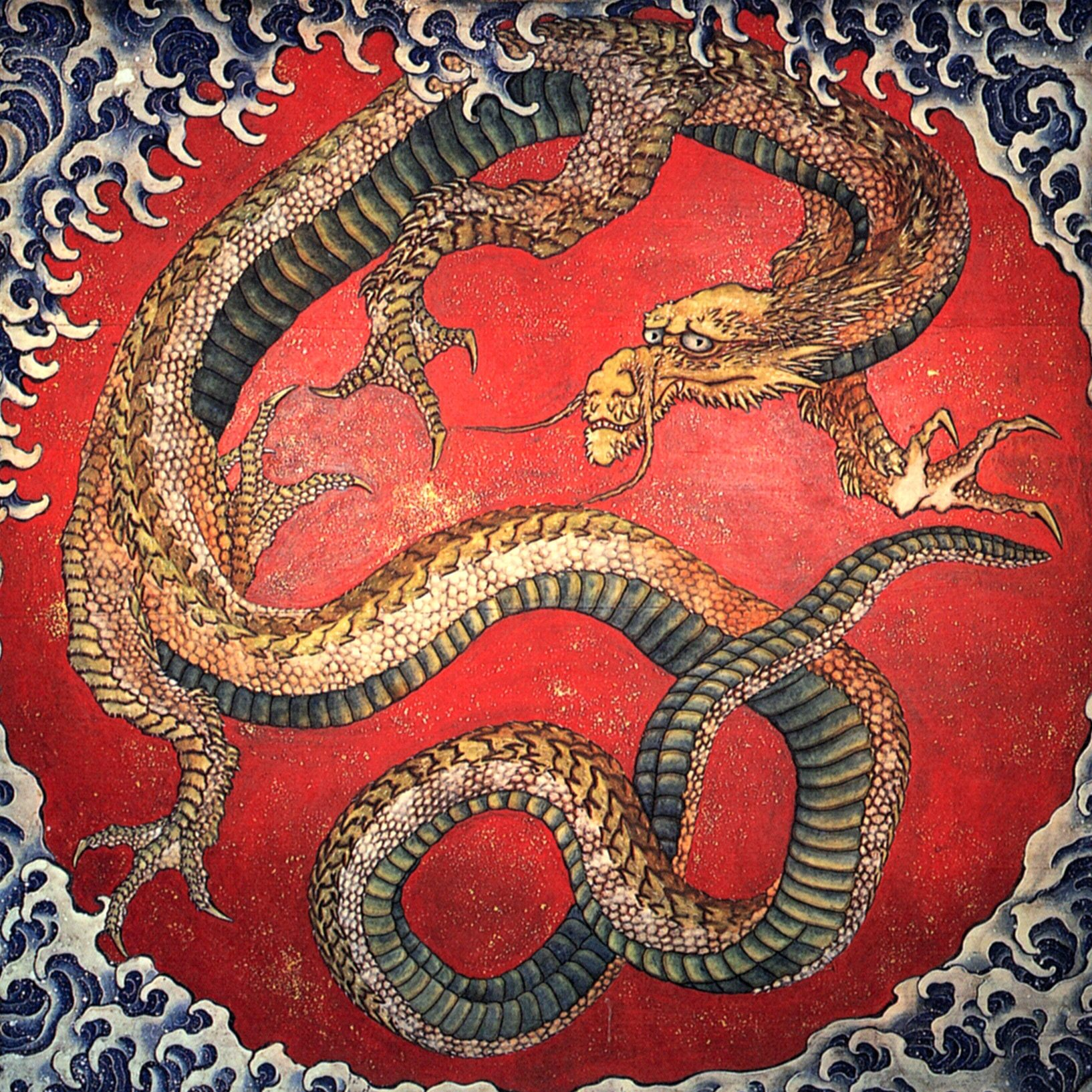
Japanese dragon, by Hokusai

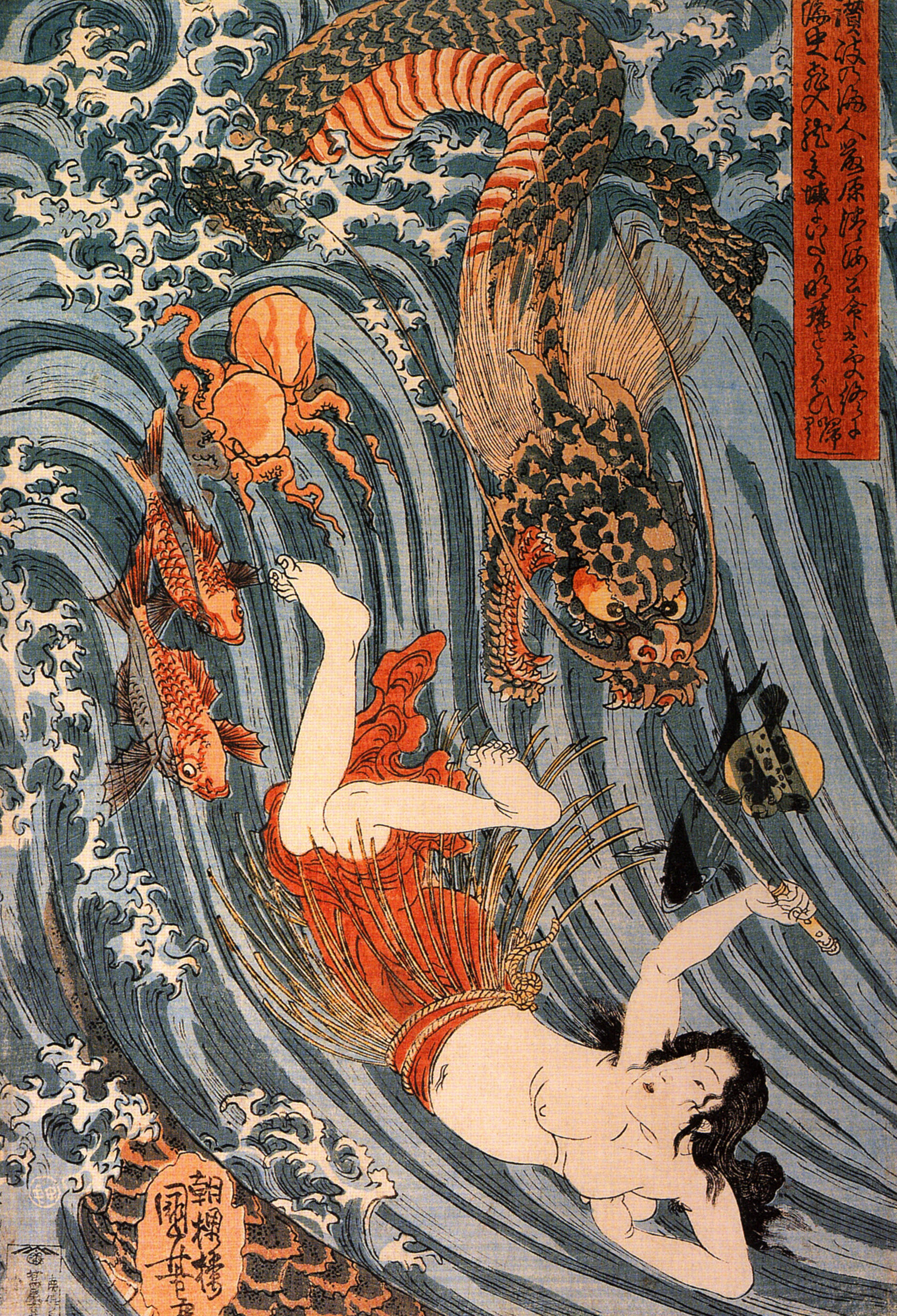
Princess Tamatori steals the Dragon King's jewel, by Utagawa Kuniyoshi.

Japanese dragons (日本の竜/龍, Nihon no ryū) (Note: Or 竜/龍 (tatsu), in kun'yomi or 龍 (ryō) pronounced archaically. Cf. § Sino-Japanese dragons.) are diverse legendary creatures in Japanese mythology and folklore. Japanese dragon myths amalgamate native legends with imported stories about dragons from China, Korea and the Indian subcontinent. The style and appearance of the dragon was heavily influenced by the Chinese dragon, especially the three-clawed long (龍) dragons which were introduced in Japan from China in ancient times. Like these other East Asian dragons, most Japanese ones are water deities or kami associated with rainfall and bodies of water, and are typically depicted as large, wingless, serpentine creatures with clawed feet.

== Indigenous Japanese dragons ==
The c. 680 AD Kojiki and the c. 720 AD Nihongi mytho-histories have the first Japanese textual references to dragons. "In the oldest annals the dragons are mentioned in various ways," explains de Visser, "but mostly as water-gods, serpent- or dragon-shaped." The Kojiki and Nihongi mention several ancient dragons:

- Yamata no Orochi (八岐大蛇; lit. 'eight-branched giant snake') was an eight-headed and eight-tailed dragon slain by the god of wind Susanoo, who discovered the Kusanagi-no-Tsurugi (legendary sword of the Imperial Regalia of Japan) in one of its tails.
- Watatsumi (海神; lit. 'sea god') or Ryūjin (龍神; lit. 'dragon god') was the ruler of seas and oceans, and described as a dragon capable of changing into human form. He lived in the undersea Ryūgū-jō (龍宮城; lit. 'dragon palace castle'), where he kept the magical tide jewels.
- Toyotama-hime (豊玉姫; lit. 'Luminous Pearl Princess') was Ryūjin's daughter. She purportedly was an ancestress of Emperor Jimmu, Japan's legendary first emperor.
- Wani (鰐) was a sea monster that is translated as both "shark" and "crocodile". Kuma-wani (熊鰐; 'bear (i.e., giant or strong) shark/crocodile') are mentioned in two ancient legends. One says the sea god Kotoshiro-nushi-no-kami transformed into an "8-fathom kuma-wani" and fathered Toyotama-hime, the other says a kuma-wani piloted the ships of Emperor Chūai and his Empress Jingū.
- Mizuchi (蛟 or 虯) was a river dragon and water deity. The Nihongi records legendary Emperor Nintoku offering human sacrifices to mizuchi angered by his river engineering projects.
- Raijū is Raijin's animal companion and messenger that commonly take form of a dragon, qilin or komainu.
- Kiyohime (清姫; lit. 'Purity Princess') was a teahouse waitress who fell in love with a young Buddhist priest. After he spurned her, she studied magic, transformed into a dragon, and killed him.
- Nure-onna (濡女; lit. 'Wet Woman') was a dragon with a woman's head and a snake's body. She was typically seen while washing her hair on a riverbank and would sometimes kill humans when angered.
- Zennyo Ryūō (善如龍王; lit. 'goodness-like dragon king') was a rain-god depicted either as a dragon with a snake on its head or as a human with a snake's tail.
- In the fairy tale "My Lord Bag of Rice", the Ryūō "dragon king" of Lake Biwa asks the hero Tawara Tōda (田原藤太) to kill a giant centipede.
- Urashima Tarō rescued a turtle which took him to Ryūgū-jō and turned into the attractive daughter of the ocean god Ryūjin.

== Sino-Japanese dragons ==
Chinese dragon mythology is the source of Japanese dragon mythology. Japanese words for "dragon" are written with kanji ("Chinese characters"), either simplified shinjitai 竜 or traditional kyūjitai 龍 from Chinese long 龍. These kanji can be read tatsu in native Japanese kun'yomi, (Note: As for tatsu (竜/龍), in kun'yomi, note that Japanese custom also followed the Chinese zodiac ("Year of the Dragon") system, in which case the character tatsu (辰) is used. This latter character has traditionally been frequently employed in personal names.) and ryū or ryō in Sino-Japanese on'yomi. (Note: Alternatively ryō (龍), as archaically pronounced, especially in certain combined forms in set phrases, e.g., garyō tensei (画竜点睛), or riryō ganka no tama (驪竜頷下の珠; "jewel below the jaw of the black dragon").)

Many Japanese dragon names are loanwords from Chinese. For instance, the Japanese counterparts of the astrological Four Symbols are:

- Seiryū < Qinglong 青龍 "Azure Dragon"
- Suzaku < Zhuque 朱雀 "Vermilion Bird"
- Byakko < Baihu 白虎 "White Tiger"
- Genbu < Xuanwu 玄武 "Black Tortoise"

Japanese Shiryū 四竜 "4 dragon [kings]" are the legendary Chinese Longwang 龍王 "Dragon Kings" who rule the four seas.

- Gōkō < Aoguang 敖廣 "Dragon King of the East Sea"
- Gōkin < Aoqin 敖欽 "Dragon King of the South Sea"
- Gōjin < Aorun 敖閏 "Dragon King of the West Sea"
- Gōjun < Aoshun 敖順 "Dragon King of the North Sea"

Some authors attempt to differentiate Japanese ryū and Chinese long dragons by the number of claws on their feet. In 1886 Charles Gould wrote that in Japan the dragon is "invariably figured as possessing three claws, whereas in China it has four or five, according to whether it is an ordinary or an Imperial emblem". A common belief in Japan is that the Japanese dragon was native to Japan and was fond of travelling, gaining claws as it walked further from Japan; e.g. when it arrived in Korea, it gained 4-claws; and when it finally arrived to China, it gained five-claws. However, contrary to the Japanese belief that the three-clawed dragons also originated in China and were introduced to Japan. Three-clawed dragons were depicted in China earlier in history and were the principal form of dragons which were used on the robes of the Tang dynasty. When the Chinese dragons were introduced in Japan, they still had three claws. Three-clawed dragons were seldom used after the Song dynasty and were later depicted with four or five claws in China. Three-clawed dragons were briefly revived during the Qing dynasty.

During World War II the Japanese military named many armaments after Chinese dragons. The Kōryū 蛟竜 < jiaolong 蛟龍 "flood dragon" was a midget submarine and the Shinryū 神竜 < shenlong 神龍 "spirit dragon" was a rocket kamikaze aircraft. An Imperial Japanese Army division, the 56th Division, was codenamed the Dragon Division. Coincidentally, the Dragon Division was annihilated in the Chinese town of Longling (龍陵), whose name means "Dragon's Tomb".

== Indo-Japanese dragons ==
When Buddhist monks from other parts of Asia brought their faith to Japan they transmitted dragon and snake legends from Buddhist and Hindu mythology. The most notable examples are the nāga ナーガ or 龍 "Nāga; rain deity; protector of Buddhism" and the nāgarāja ナーガラージャ or 龍王 "Nāgarāja; snake king; dragon king". de Visser (1913:179) notes that many Japanese nāga legends have Chinese features. "This is quite clear, for it was via China that all the Indian tales came to Japan. Moreover, many originally Japanese dragons, to which Chinese legends were applied, were afterwards identified with nāga, so that a blending of ideas was the result.

Some additional examples of Buddhistic Japanese dragons are:

- Hachidai ryūō 八大龍王 "8 great naga kings" assembled to hear the Buddha expound on the Lotus Sutra, and are a common artistic motif.
- Mucharinda ムチャリンダ "Mucalinda" was the Nāga king who protected the Buddha when he achieved bodhi, and is frequently represented as a giant cobra.
- Benzaiten 弁才天 is the Japanese name of the goddess Saraswati, who killed a 3-headed Vritra serpent or dragon in the Rigveda. According to the Enoshima Engi, Benzaiten created Enoshima Island in 552 CE in order to thwart a 5-headed dragon that had been harassing people.
- Kuzuryū 九頭龍 "9-headed dragon", deriving from the multi-headed Naga king シェーシャ or 舍沙 "Shesha", is worshipped at Togakushi Shrine in Nagano Prefecture.
- Gozuryū 五頭龍 "5-headed dragon" is worshipped at Ryuko Myojin Shrine in Kamakura.

== Dragon temples ==
Dragon lore is traditionally associated with Buddhist temples. Myths about dragons living in ponds and lakes near temples are widespread. De Visser lists accounts for Shitennō-ji in Osaka, Gogen Temple in Hakone, Kanagawa, and the shrine on Mount Haku where the Genpei Jōsuiki records that a Zen priest saw a nine-headed dragon transform into the goddess Kannon. In the present day, the Lake Saiko Dragon Shrine at Fujiyoshida, Yamanashi has an annual festival and fireworks show.

Temple names, like Japanese toponyms, frequently involve dragons. For instance, the Rinzai sect has Tenryū-ji 天龍寺 "Heavenly Dragon Temple", Ryūtaku-ji 龍沢寺 "Dragon Swamp Temple", Ryōan-ji 竜安寺 "Dragon Peace Temple". According to legend, when the Hōkō-ji 法興寺 or Asuka-dera 飛鳥寺 Buddhist temple was dedicated at Nara in 596, "a purple cloud descended from the sky and covered the pagoda as well as the Buddha hall; then the cloud became five-coloured and assumed the shape of a dragon or phoenix".

The Kinryū-no-Mai "Golden Dragon Dance" is an annual Japanese dragon dance performed at Sensō-ji, a Buddhist temple in Asakusa. The dragon dancers twist and turn within the temple grounds and outside on the streets. According to legend, the Sensō Temple was founded in 628 after two fishermen found a gold statuette of Kannon in the Sumida River, at which time golden dragons purportedly ascended into heaven. The Golden Dragon Dance was produced to celebrate the reconstruction of the Main Hall of the temple in 1958 and is performed twice yearly.

== Images ==
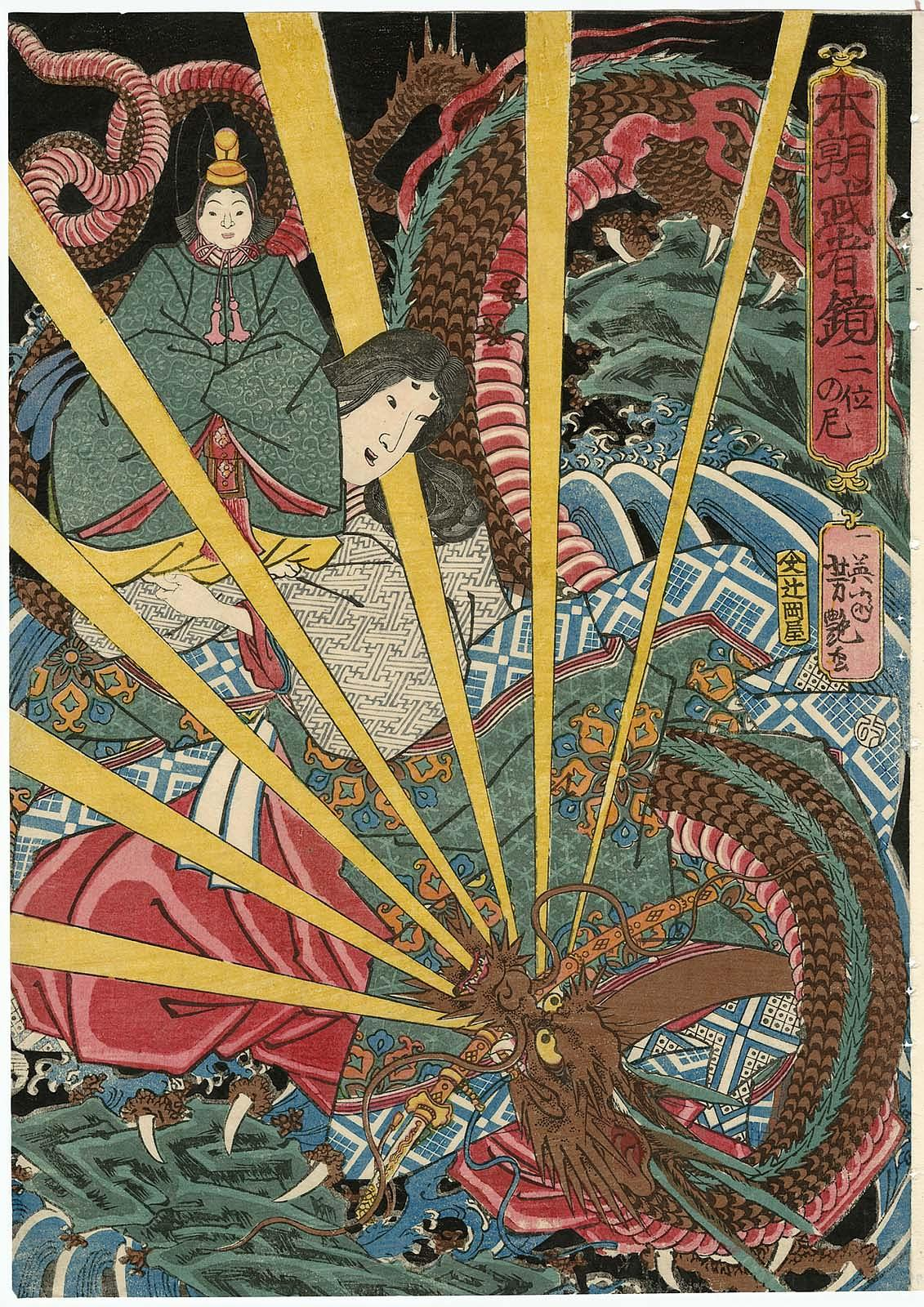
Emperor Antoku's grandmother rescuing him from a dragon, by Yoshitsuya Ichieisai

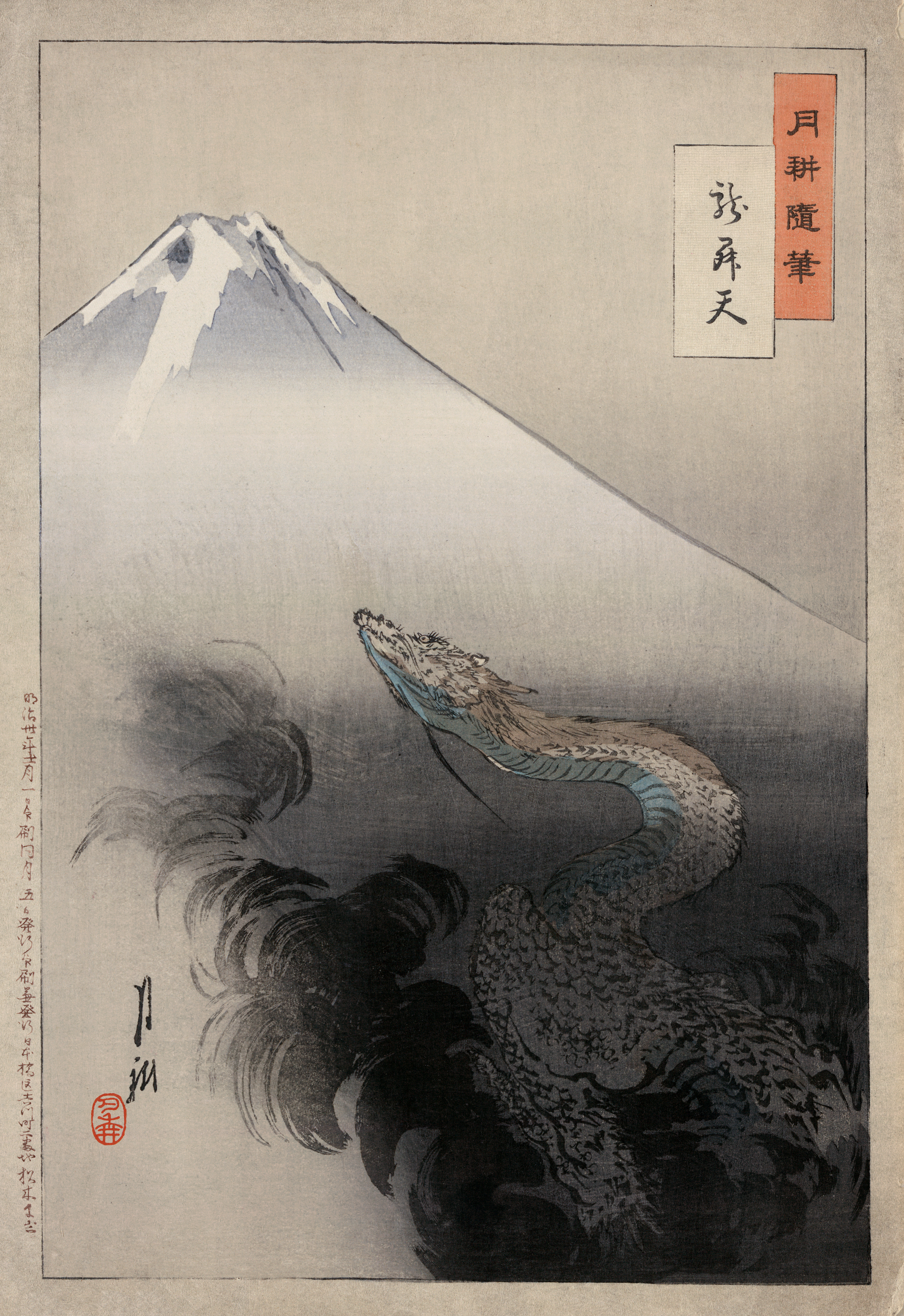
A dragon ascends towards the heavens with Mount Fuji in the background in this 1897 ukiyo-e print from Ogata Gekkō's Views of Mount Fuji.

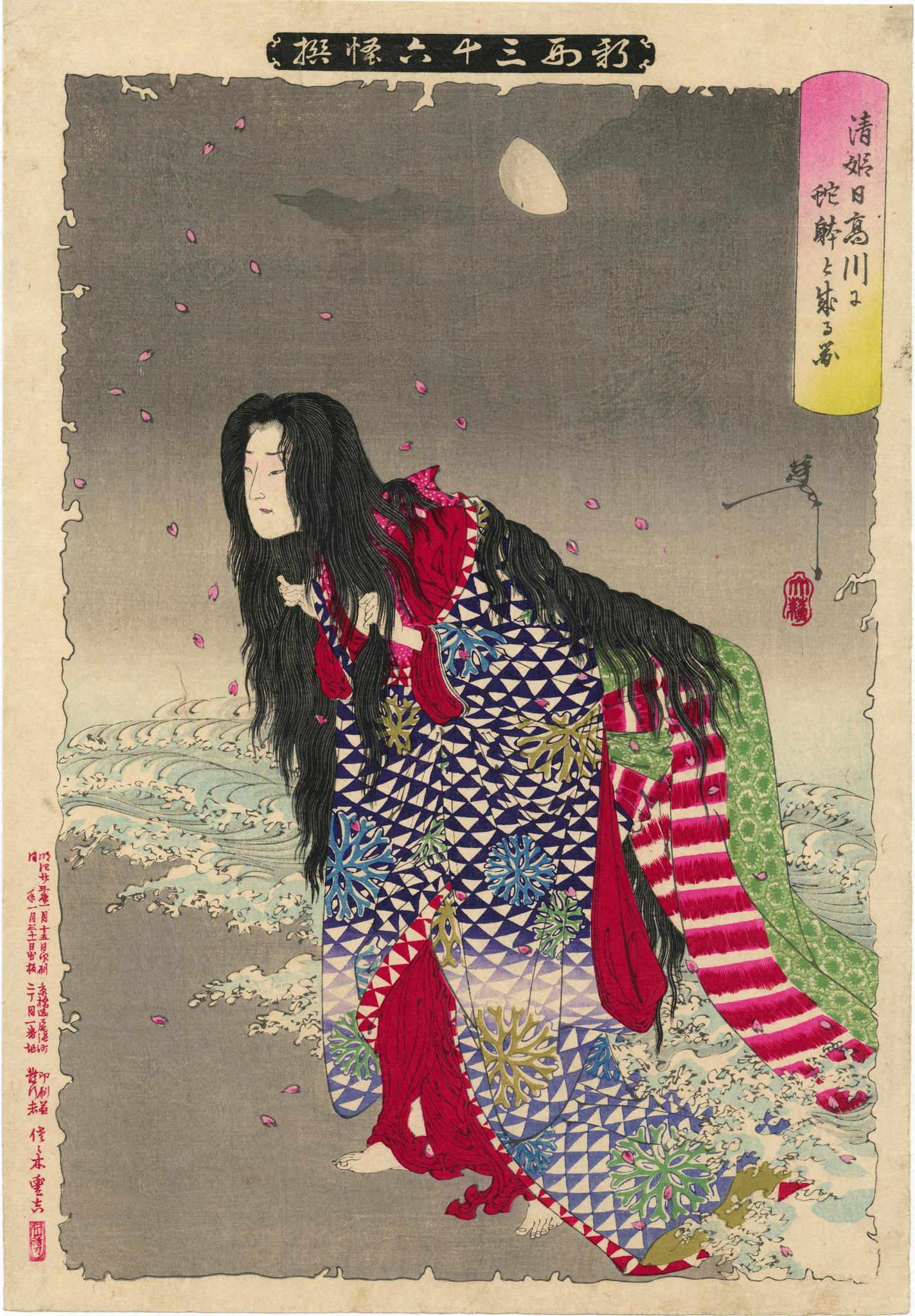
Kiyohime Changes from a Dragon into a human woman, by Yoshitoshi Tsukioka

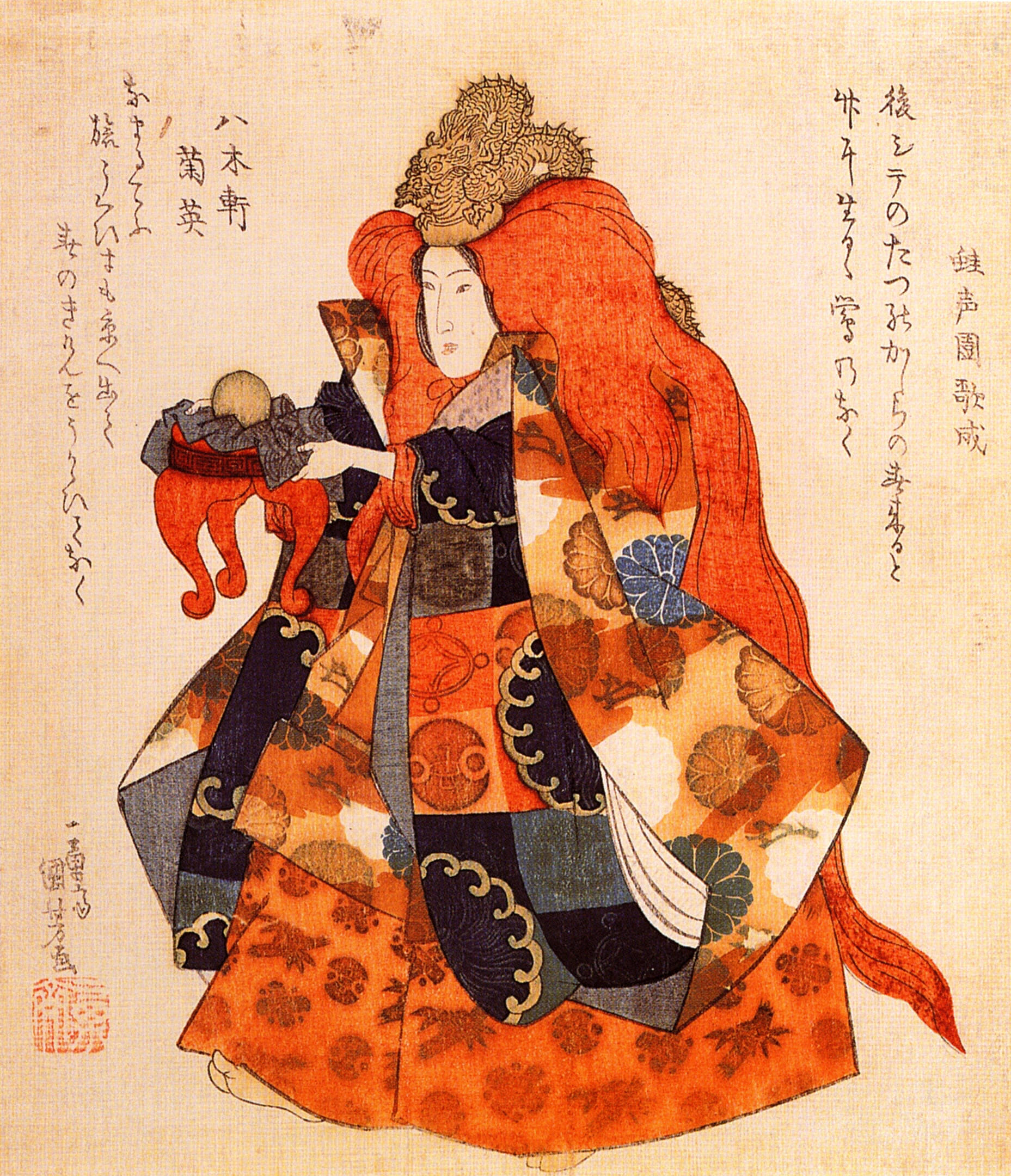
The Dragon King's daughter, whose father the Dragon King lives at the bottom of the sea. By Utagawa Kuniyoshi

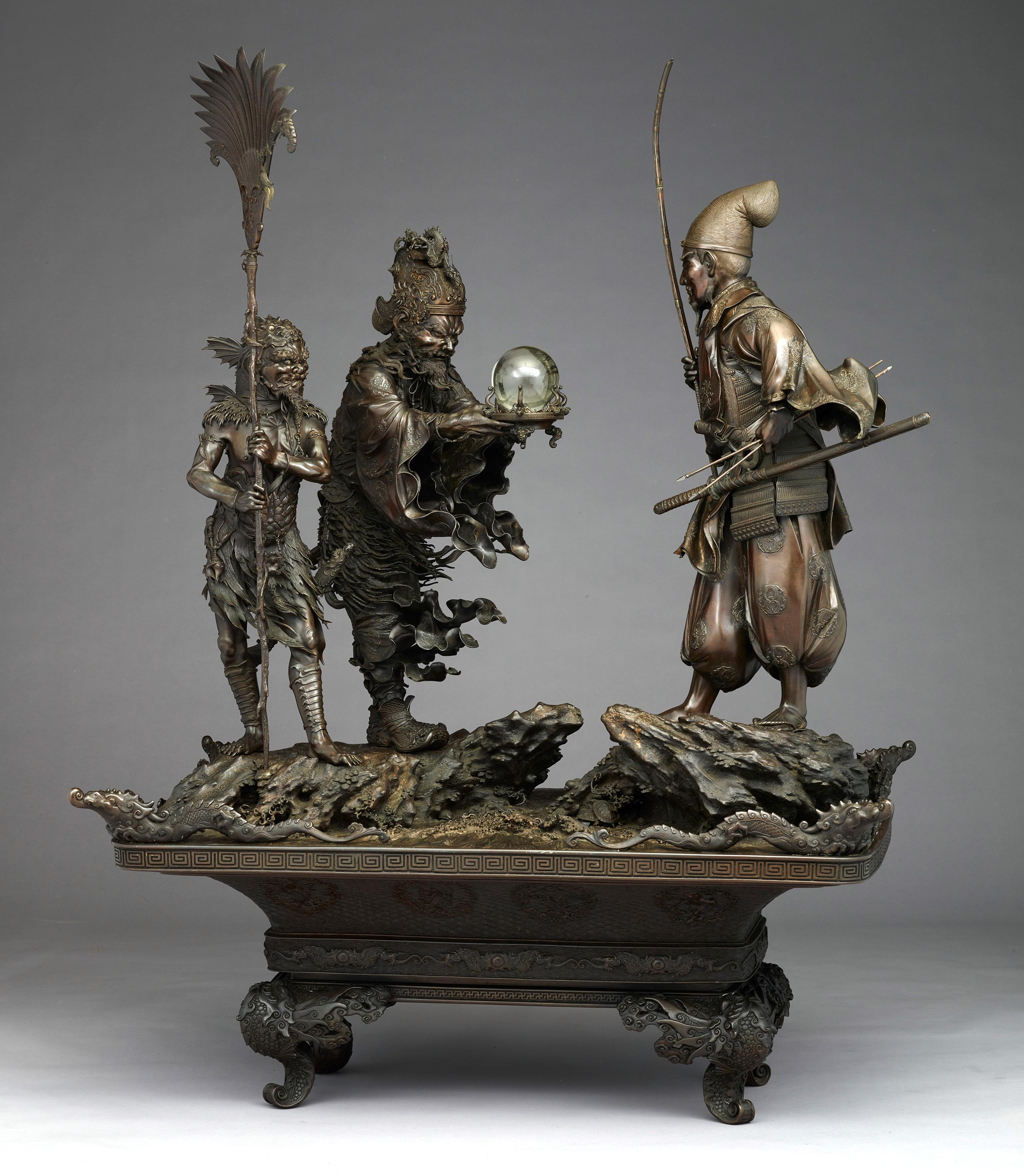
Takenouchi no Sukune Meets the Dragon King of the Sea

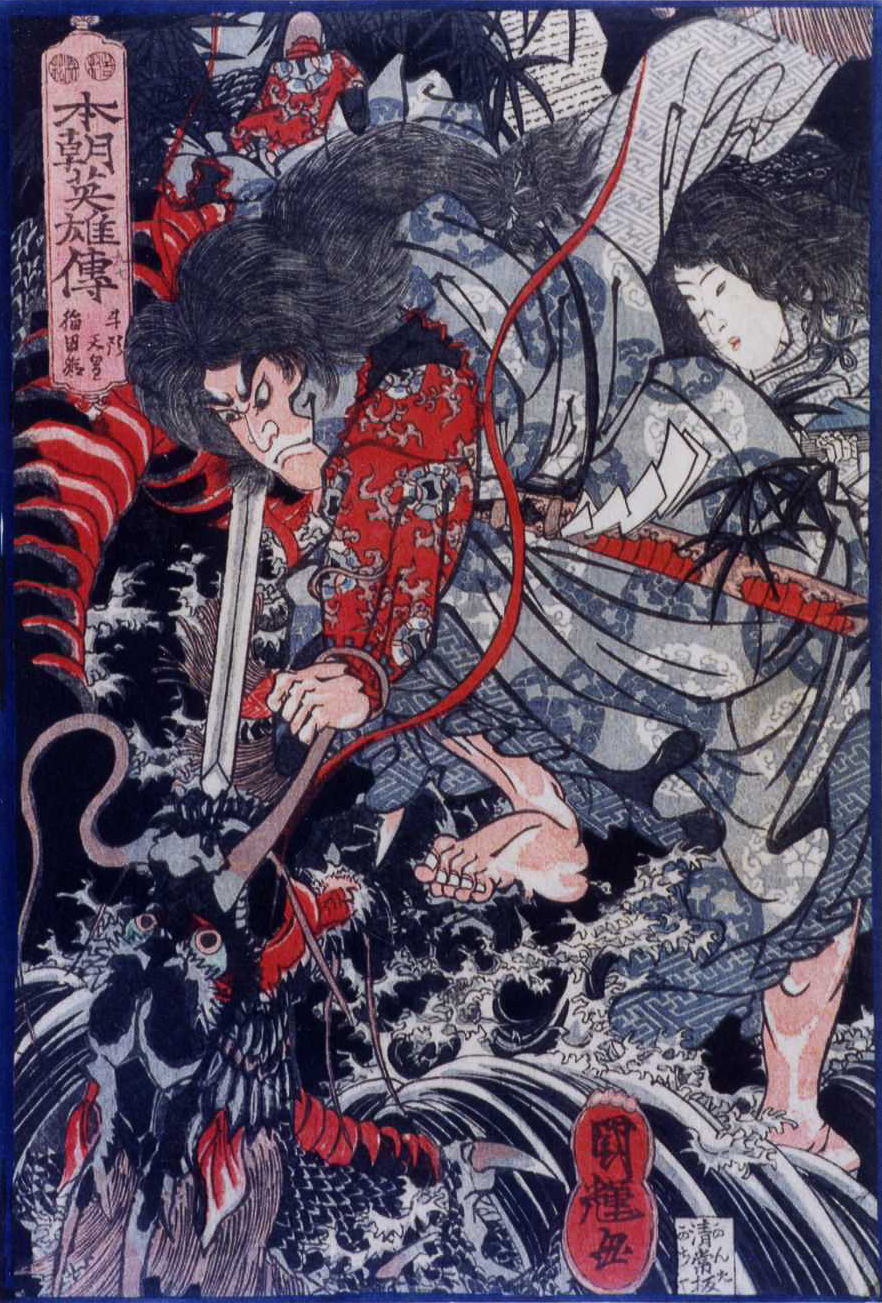
Susanoo slaying the Yamata no Orochi, by Kuniteru

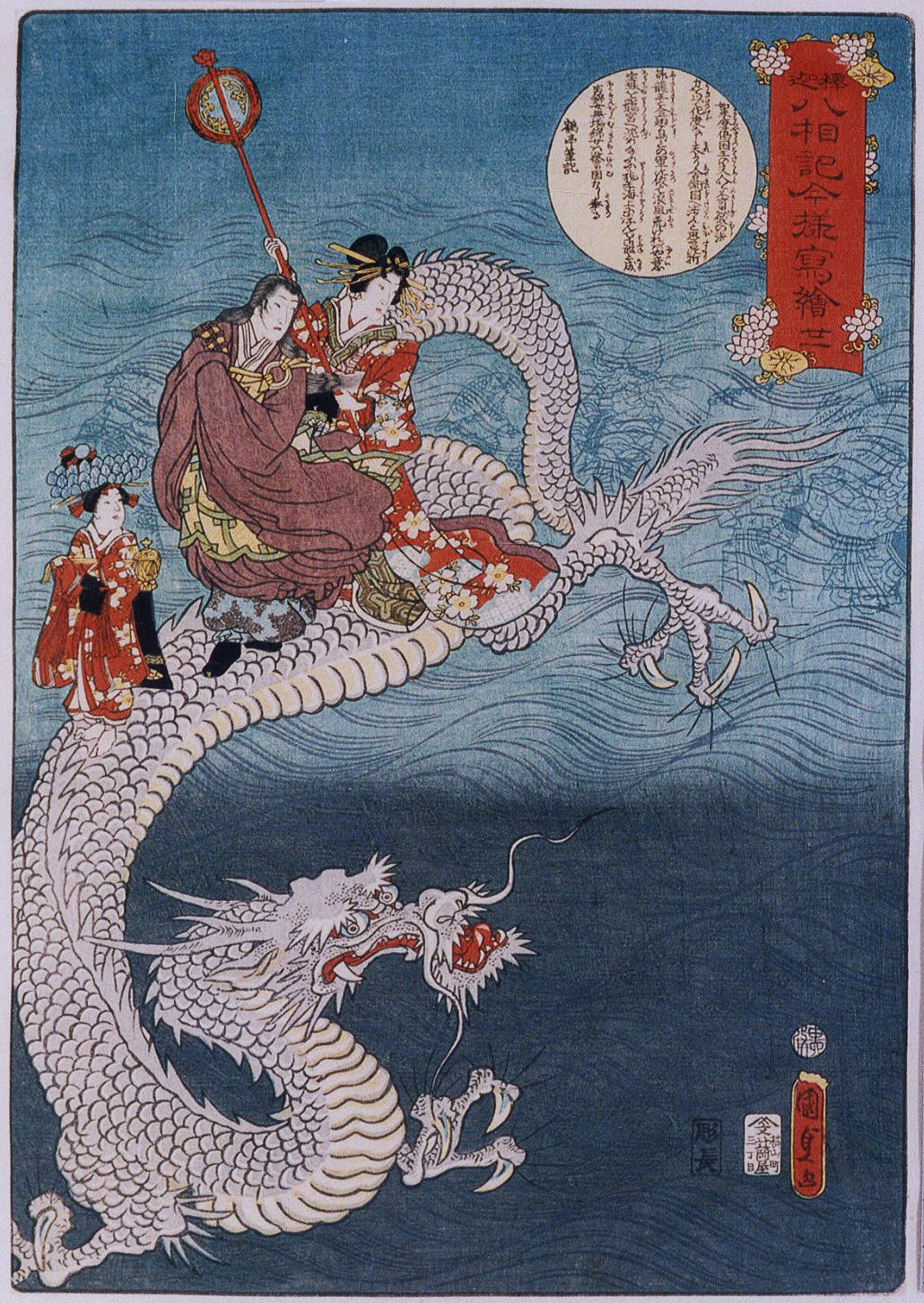
The Buddha riding a sea-dragon, by Kunisada.

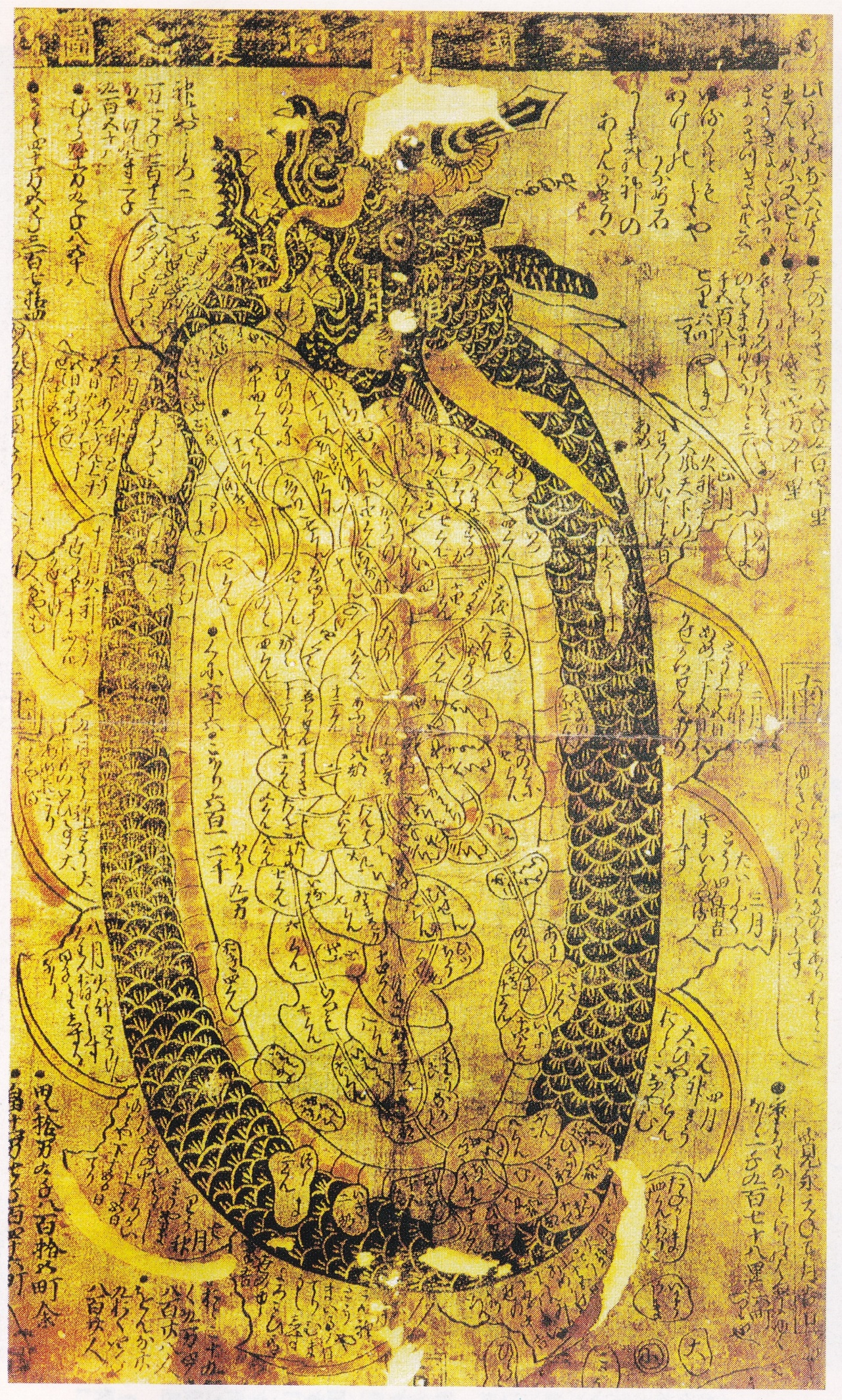
Earthquake map with a dragon surrounds Japan, 1624

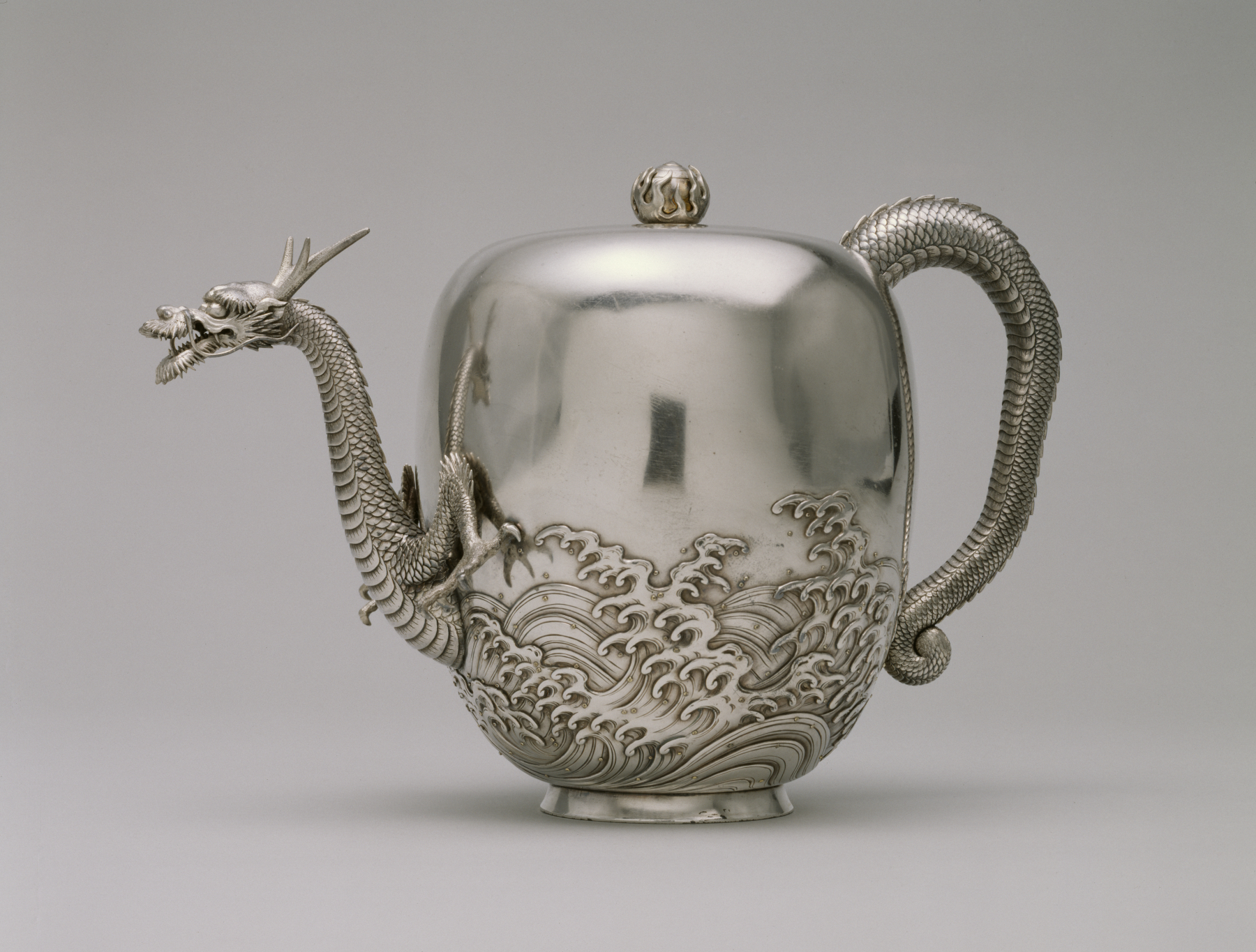
Dragon teapot, Walters Art Museum

== Dragon shrines ==
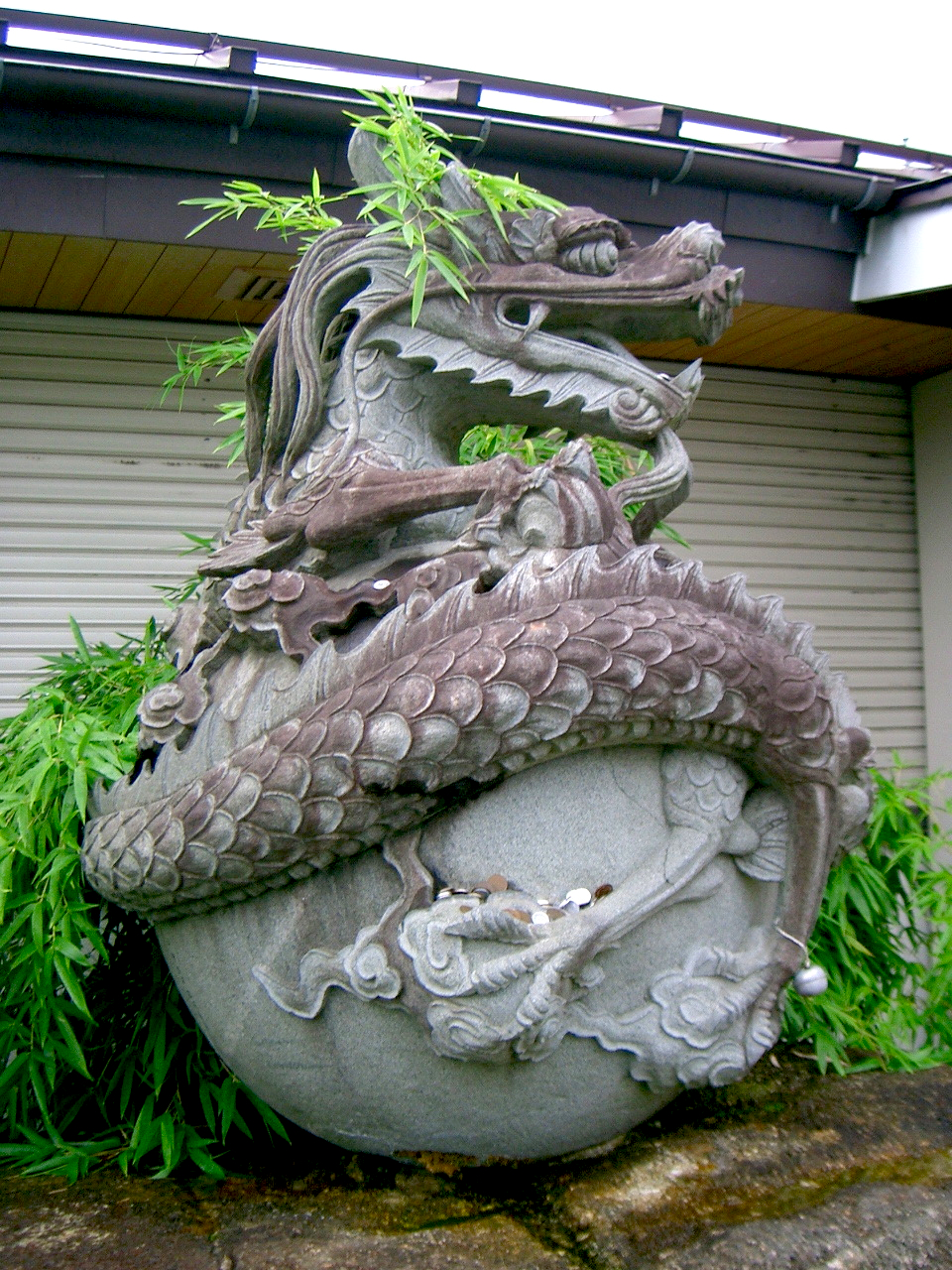
Japanese Dragon shrine in Fujiyoshida.

Japanese dragons are mostly associated with Shinto shrines as well as some Buddhist temples.

Itsukushima Shrine on Miyajima or Itsukushima Island in Japan's Inland Sea was believed to be the abode of the sea-god Ryūjin's daughter. According to the Gukanshō and The Tale of Heike (Heinrich 1997:74–75), the sea-dragon empowered Emperor Antoku to ascend the throne because his father Taira no Kiyomori offered prayers at Itsukushima and declared it his ancestral shrine. When Antoku drowned himself after being defeated in the 1185 Battle of Dan-no-ura, he lost the imperial Kusanagi sword (which legendarily came from the tail of the Yamata no Orochi] dragon) back into the sea. In another version, divers found the sword, and it is said to be preserved at Atsuta Shrine. The great earthquake of 1185 was attributed to vengeful Heike spirits, specifically the dragon powers of Antoku.

Ryūjin shinkō 竜神信仰 "dragon god faith" is a form of Shinto religious belief that worships dragons as water kami. It is connected with agricultural rituals, rain prayers, and the success of fisherman.

== Dragons in modern Japanese culture ==
- The Imperial Japanese Army Air Force gave some of their aircraft dragon-related names, for example the Kawasaki Ki-45 twin-engine fighter was called Toryu (Dragon Slayer), the Mitsubishi Ki-67 bomber was called Hiryu (Flying Dragon) and the Nakajima Ki-49 bomber was called Donryu (Storm Dragon).
- The Imperial Japanese Navy and later the Japan Maritime Self-Defense Force named some of their ships after dragons. Notable examples are the World War II-era aircraft carriers Hiryu and Sōryū and the modern submarines of the Sōryū class.
- The dragon is a popular figure in yakuza art.
- Manda, the kaiju film character appearing in films produced by Toho, is depicted as a Japanese dragon.
- Dragon Ball, a popular manga and anime franchise.
- In the popular anime and manga series One Piece, The antagonist Kaidou has the ability to transform into a Japanese Dragon because of the power he gained from eating the devil fruit known as the Uo Uo no Mi, Model: Seiryu (Fish-Fish Fruit, Model: Azure Dragon). Kouzuki Momonosuke ate an artificial version of the same fruit, gaining the same transformation, but as a pink dragon.

== See also ==
- Chinese dragon
- Japanese folklore
- Japanese mythology
- Korean dragon
- Manipuri dragons
- Vietnamese dragon

== General and cited references ==
- Aston, William George, tr. 1896. Nihongi: Chronicles of Japan from the Earliest Times to A.D. 697. 2 vols. Kegan Paul. 1972
- Chamberlain, Basil H., tr. 1919. The Kojiki, Records of Ancient Matters.
- Gould, Charles. 1896. Mythical Monsters. W. H. Allen & Co.
- Heinrich, Amy Vladeck. 1997. Currents in Japanese Culture: Translations and Transformations. Columbia University Press.
- Ingersoll, Ernest. 1928. "Chapter Nine: The Dragon in Japanese Art", in Dragons and Dragon Lore, Payson & Clarke. Also: Ingersoll, Ernest, et al., (2013). The Illustrated Book of Dragons and Dragon Lore. Chiang Mai: Cognoscenti Books. ASIN B00D959PJ0
- Smith, G. Elliot. 1919. The Evolution of the Dragon;. Longmans, Green & Co.
- de Visser, Marinus Willem (1913). The Dragon in China and Japan. J. Müller. Archived from the original on 2008-10-26.
