= Azumi people =

Historical ethnic group inhabiting northern Kyūshū

- Warrior Clan, Seafarers, Farmers
- Kyushu Region in Japan
- Ethnicity: Azumi
- Location: Northern Kyushu
- Language: Japonic or Austronesian
- Religion: Shintoism
- Surnames: Azumi no

The Azumi (阿曇氏 or 安曇族) were a warrior clan and tribe who originated during the Jōmon period in Japan, whose cultures and beliefs are considered to be one of Japan's earliest sea religions. Their existence dates back to the early 3rd – 7th centuries, when their extensive knowledge of navigation between waters made them the naval force of Yamato Japan in Kyushu. They originally lived in Northern Kyushu, especially in an area called Chikuzen, now part of modern-day Fukuoka Prefecture. Their understanding of tides, weather patterns and constellations ensured their successful voyaging. In essence, the working of Azumi life was centered around their sea god, Watatsumi and their deity ‘Isora’, who provided the Azumi people with a strong sense of spiritual guidance throughout their day-to-day life.

== History ==
The Azumi people were a tribe from Northern Kyushu in Southern Japan.

They were the oldest group and leaders of the “Ama”, a group of people who navigated the waters of West Japan (Tsushima), Korea and China. They also performed trade with China and Korea and were responsible for the transport of iron from the Korean Peninsula to Northern Kyushu. According to some historians, the Azumi were "the oldest known maritime force of [Japan's] emerging imperial state."

The Azumi people were extremely skilled seafarers and their extensive knowledge of water currents, tidal changes, weather and star constellations is believed to have been passed down from generation to generation. Their ability to navigate the seas, especially at night, made them useful to the Japanese imperial government during the 3rd to early 5th centuries and they were effectively the naval force of Yamato Japan. With the new responsibility and accountability accorded to them, the Azumi people became the biggest influence in controlling the various Inland Sea routes to Kyushu along the Inland Coast. In this role, it was the Grand General of the naval force who was in charge of protecting these seas.

Azumi no Hirafu, a member of the Azumi tribe, was appointed this role as Grand General when the emperor sighted him along with a group of men swimming toward their boat on the Inland Sea. These men wore deer antlers covering their heads, appearing as a close herd of deer on the seas. In the ancient beliefs of Shinto, deer were believed to be spiritual messengers, or specifically ‘Messengers to God’. Today in Nara, the modern capital of Japan, this belief and symbolism of the deer has continued, as over one thousand deer freely roam the Kasuga Grand Shrine, remaining intrinsically linked with both the kami revered there and the descendants of the Azumi.

Before voyaging, the Azumi people often performed rituals of sea-worship to the oceanic deities as they believed this assisted them to establish control and territory in various regions of the sea. However, when they faced defeat at the Bay of Hakunsonko in 633, Azumi no Hirafu, along with other members of the Azumi tribe spread along to the various regions of Japan, with the majority leaving the straits of northern Kyushu. In these voyages, they became involved in other specialities and traditions. One of these roles included preparing and tasting imperial food, otherwise known as “Saba”. Under the Japanese legal system of Ritsuryō, they became affiliated with the department of the Ministry of the Imperial Household responsible for preparing the emperor's food, largely because of their historic role of providing seafood to the imperial state. The Azumi became prominently known for specialising in preparing imperial meals later in the clan's history as this formed as an additional part of the responsibility that they owed the imperial government.

Although some of the Azumi people stayed and continued the traditional life as sea goers, for those who decided to leave sea life, many ended up on the small island of Shinshu, where they became heavily involved in farming and agriculture. During these times, even though they were no longer seafarers, it is believed that they still maintained their intrinsic connection to their past ancestors through regularly praying to the deity Isora, thankful for the water which flowed from Kamikochi's mountains granting them successful crop irrigation.

The Azumi people who did not choose to engage with the farming lifestyle in Shinshu ended up in the Azumi Basin. Here, they formed a small fishing village and developed their language, continuing to practice their core spirituality to the deity Isora. Over time, they became known as “the people who lived at the sea.”

In the late 7th Century, the Azumi people also had a key role in maintaining peace for the Yamato Court's maritime and became core allies in warfare. However, this rapport became troubled during the ‘Tenumu Reign’ in 682. Emperor Tenumu invaded South Kyushu, but instead of inflicting war on the Yamato Court, they offered tokens of their gratitude in appreciation of the Azumi people's comradery and supposed obedience to them. This gesture confused the Yamato Court, and led them to doubt and question the loyalty of the Azumi People.

Today, the places to which the Azumi people voyaged to have been named after their presence (Kakojima, Kagoshima, Kashima, Shikashima) and there are still traces of their existence remaining in the areas they commonly voyaged through (Islands of Tsushima Straits, Kyushu, Shikoku, Awaji Islands).

== Origin ==
According to Japanese historians, they were of Austronesian or Japanese origin, related to the Hayato people. They were in early contact with the Yamato court, providing important maritime trade links to the Japanese capital and influencing the court's military and diplomatic efforts at sea. Some Azumi migrated further inland, settling in what is now known as Azumino Valley or Azumi Basin in Nagano prefecture. They also spread toward the imperial center, settling in Settsu province around what is now Osaka. Remnants of Azumi culture are also found on Awaji Island in Hyogo prefecture.

Being a leading tribe during the Yayoi period, the Azumi held the common belief of a deity who would allow for safe navigation of rough seas if prayed to before embarking on a sea journey. This deity, known as ‘Azumi no Isora’ is placed at the centre of the Azumi tradition and is believed to embody the seas which surround Japan.

‘Azumi no Isora’ is also believed to emerge during the Muromachi period, around the same time as three similar Watatsumi deities: Sokotsu, Uwatsu and Ojin. These three deities, once representing the seas that surround Japan, were said to infuse into a single being known as Isora. The spirit of Isora is represented as a seahorse, and is considered a symbol of purity, providing spiritual guidance to the Azumi people throughout their day-to-day life.

Additionally, Azumi no Isora is suggested to be the primordial human ancestor as it was him that first performed the dance ritual known as “Sei-no-no” (also known as Seino and Kuwashi-O). The dance was believed to be performed in two parts with a dialogue intermission in between, spoken by two characters: the deity Isora and the goddess Toyo. In the dialogue, Isora is described to be an old man with white hair. “Sei-no-no” consists of four male dancers: two with small drums to accompany their movements and two without. All four were described to have a white cloth covering their face, dancing along in the night to the melody of flutes.

This dance has been passed down through Azumi tribe generations as a ritualistic way to explore their connection to Azumi no Isora and express their praise. It was also performed with the shells of sea turtles by the ‘Urabe Diviners’ (the first adherents of Azumi no Isora) as a gateway to determine which days were safe for voyages to sea. Additionally, the Azumi people's kinship to the Urabe Diviners and their history is symbolised by three deity stones in the shape of a sea turtle.

Today, there are multiple shrines which are dedicated to the Azumi People. There is one in Genkai Bay on Shikanoshima Island dedicated to Azumi no Isora which contains sacred stones to represent the sea turtles, as well as over a thousand deer antlers to maintain their relationship with the deities. There is another on the north side of Japan known as the Hodaka shrine. This ritualistic shrine is thought to be a ‘mini-museum’, solely dedicated to preserving the rich culture and history of the Azumi People.

== Folklore ==
When the Azumi migrated to and established themselves in the Azumi Basin around 1000 years ago, the first folklore about them was recorded. It was here where the Azumi people made up legends to warn their children of the dangers associated with wandering near the water, telling stories of a golden koi fish leaping from the water to snatch children away if they were near a river or shore alone.

An origin folktale exploring the emergence of the Azumi people and their ancestor-deities is known as “The Pyroclastic Birth of Takemikatsuchi”. This follows the story of Izanami and Izanagi; sacred deities of the Shinto religion. They were believed to be the divine beings who created the universe and formed the Island of Japan by churning it with their adorned spear.

However, their initial attempt at creating life was unsuccessful, with Izanami birthing a leech. It was believed to result from her disobedience in following the Japanese social construct of a woman – she initiated the sexual intercourse, a role assumed to be dominated by men. Although they eventually achieve success with their creation – birthing the Eight Islands of Japan and creating kami – their attempts lead to other unfortunate events, including the death of Izanami. This angers Izanagi to commit various tainted acts becoming decayed and polluted within himself.

Eventually, Izanagi chooses to repent and attempts to clean and purify himself of the stain. This is when the kami of the Watatsumi and Sumiyoshi appeared. These two kami are extremely important as they are believed to be the ancestors-deities of the Azumi tribe, playing a vital role in their emergence. Additionally, these two kami, along with Isora became known to be worshipped by the Azumi people as they were associated with skill, strategy, and seafaring.

Another folktale included the powers of their divine deity ‘Isora’. The Azumi generations detail the creation story of Isora and how his once hidden jewels located in a dragon palace on the seafloor were said to control the tides and weather patterns. They believed that the king dragon which resided in the palace did not show himself due to his ugly outward appearance; his body covered with abalone, barnacles and shellfish. However, it is suggested that the ‘kagura’ dance possessed the ability to lure out the dragon, leading the Azumi people to his endless supply of ‘treasure’: divine knowledge of the sea. ‘Kagura’ directly translates to ‘god-performance’ is linked closely with the religion of Shinto. It is suggested that ‘kagura’ was similar, if not identical to the “Sei-no-no” dance, and has been passed down and carried through the many generations. Now, it involves a masked theatrical re-enactment of Japanese history, where the performers retell the origin stories of Shinto.

Today, shrines such as the Shikaumi-jinja Shrine Okitsu-gu on Shinkanoshima Island has become the basis for worshipping Isora as well as the basis for preserving these folktales for future generations.

== Landmarks ==
=== Myojin Pond ===
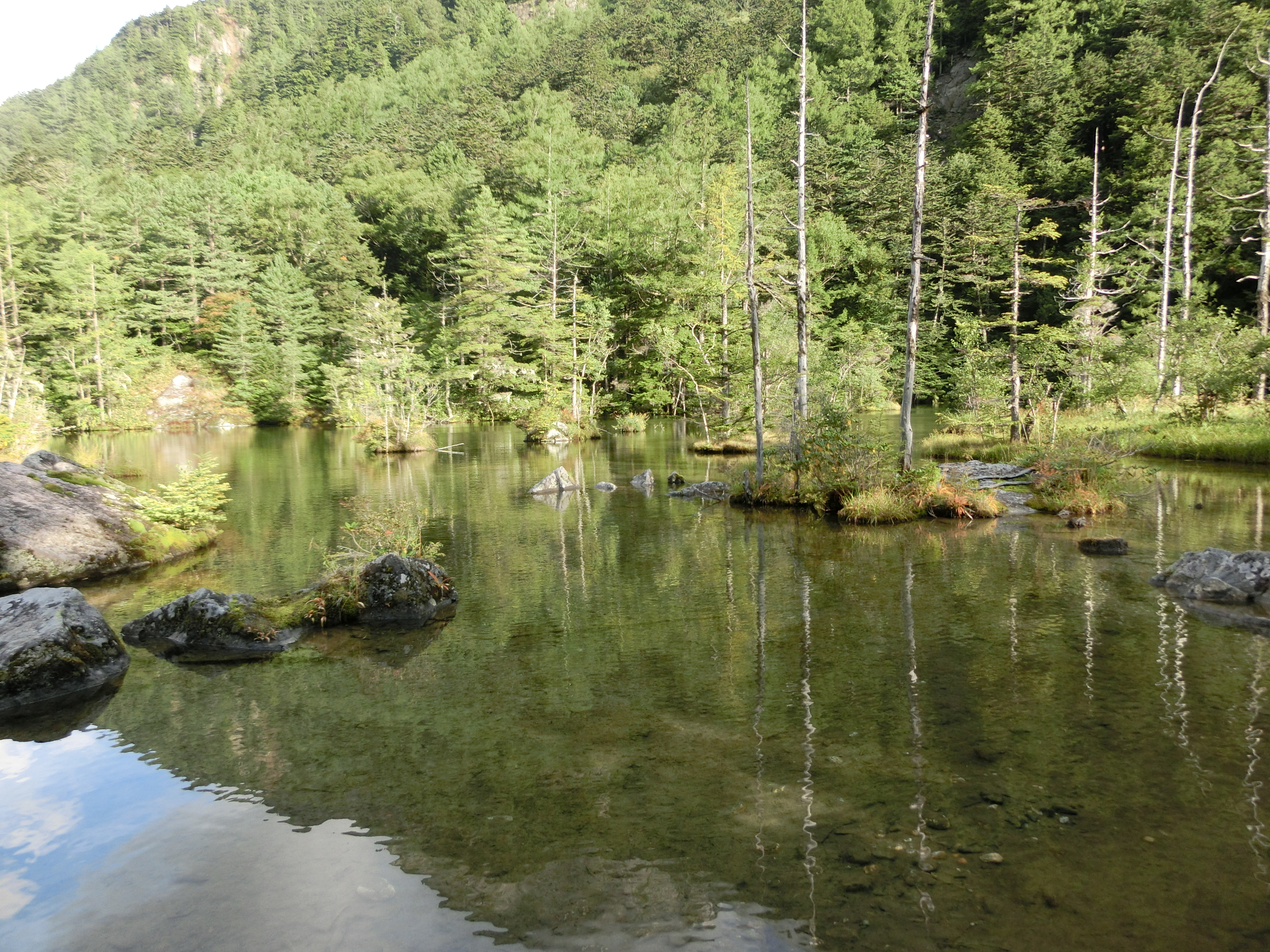
"Mirror-like" reflection of Myojin Pond.

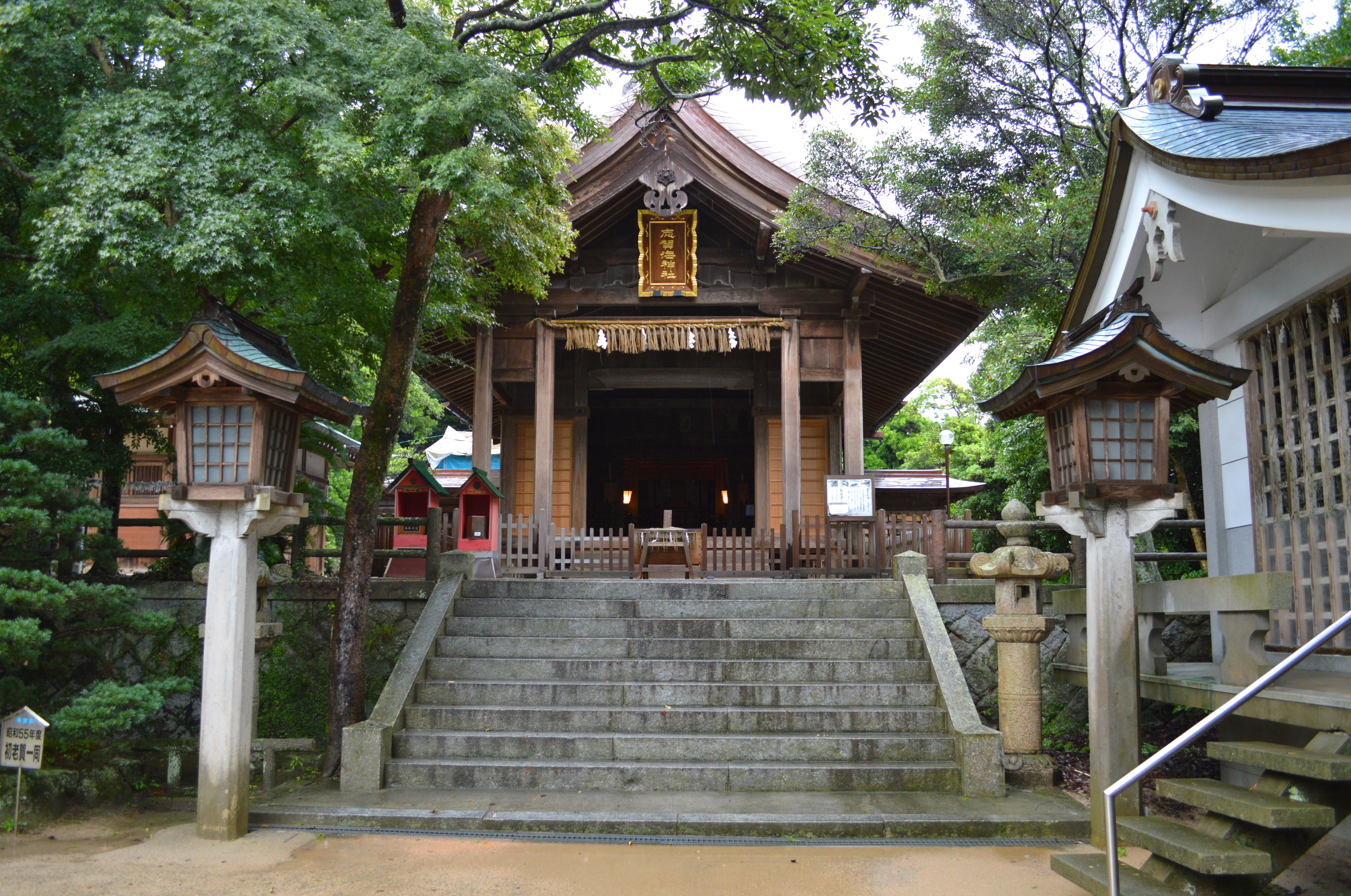
Shikaumi Shrine, considered the ancestral shrine of the Azumi, in Fukuoka.

The Myojin Pond in Kamikochi, Japan attracts both traditional descendants of the Azumi people, as well as tourists. It has a clear, mirror-like reflection, and is classified as one of the most revered places to worship the deities of the Azumi people.

At the Hotaka Shrine in Azumino City, there is an annual festival at which people express their gratitude for the gift of water. In the city, there is a traditional spot in which all three rivers (Azusa, Karasu and Nakabusa), as well as the water from the melted snow of Kamikochi's mountains, meet. Kamikochi mountain holds a great significance to the Azumi people as the water which flowed down this mountain was once used to irrigate their crops. Using this water, the people of Japan perform the rituals known as “Omizu-tori” (taking water) and “Omizu-gaeshi” (returning water), whereby the water is deemed to rightfully return to the Myojin Pond. During this celebration, the Azumi People commemorate their direct connection to water and their gratitude for it as it has always assisted them – both in their history as skillful seafarers and crop farmers.

Today, the Myojin Pond accommodates many visitors as the water that lays within is a reminder of the culture, tradition, and history of the Azumi people.

=== Shikaumi Jinja ===
Fukuoka prefecture is home to what is considered the ancestral shrine of the Azumi, Shikaumi Shrine. The shrine is presided over by a priest descended from the Azumi clan, and its biennial gojinkosai ceremony is designated an intangible cultural property by the prefecture. The shrine and its rituals make use of a deer motif, common to the historic Azumi people.
