= Ryūjin =

Japanese deity of the sea

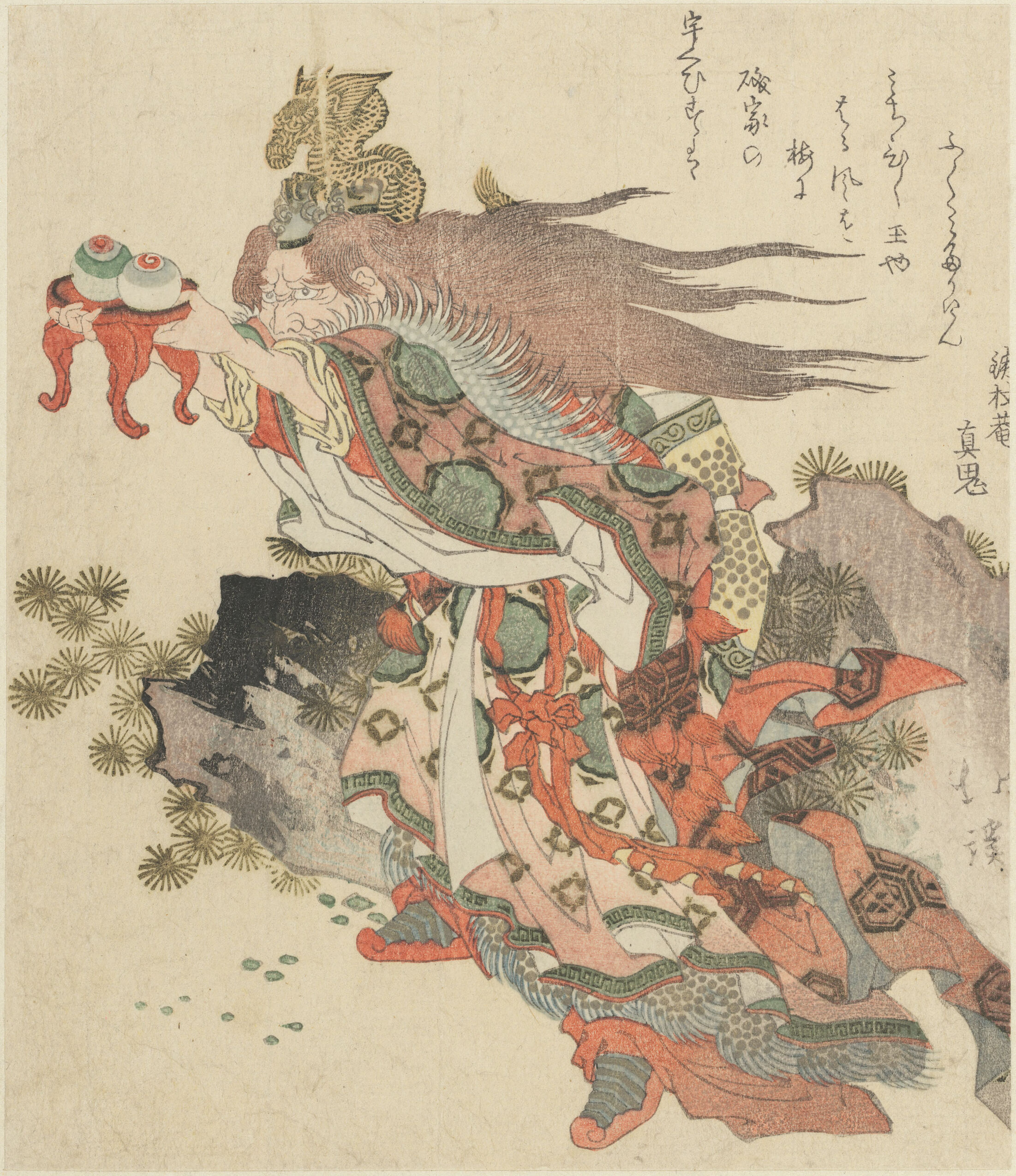
- Ryūjin presents the Tide jewels, by Hokkei, 1820

Genealogy
- Children: Kohime; Otohime

Ryūjin (龍神, lit. 'Dragon God'), which in some traditions is equivalent to Ōwatatsumi, was the tutelary deity of the sea in Japanese mythology. In many versions Ryūjin had the ability to transform into a human shape. Many believed the god had knowledge of medicine and many considered him as the bringer of rain and thunder, Ryūjin is also the patron god (ujigami) of several family groups.

This Japanese dragon, symbolizing the power of the ocean, had a large mouth. He is considered a good god and patron of Japan, since the Japanese population has for millennia lived off the bounty of the sea. Ryūjin is also credited with the challenge of a hurricane which sank the Mongolian flotilla sent by Kublai Khan. Ryūjin lived in Ryūgū-jō, his palace under the sea built out of red and white coral, from where he controlled the tides with magical Tide jewels. Sea turtles, fish, jellyfish, snakes, and other sea creatures are often seen as Ryūjin's servants.

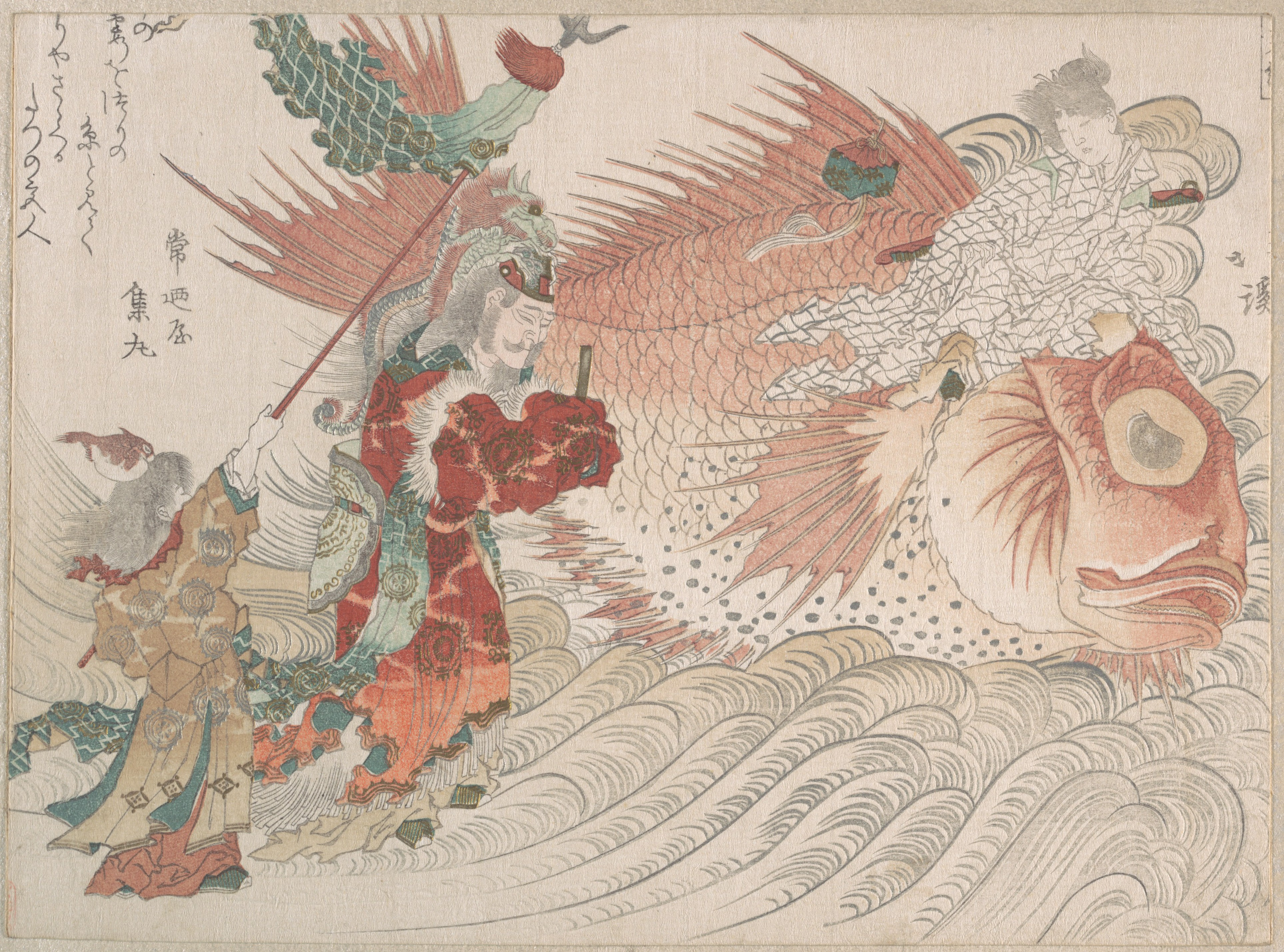
Ryūjin sends off Urashima Tarō back home on a Tai, by Hokkei, 1820

== Mythology ==
=== How the jellyfish lost its bones ===
One legend involving Ryūjin is the story about how the jellyfish lost its bones. According to this story, Ryūjin wanted to eat a monkey's liver (in some versions of the story, to heal an incurable rash), and sent the jellyfish to get him a monkey. The monkey managed to sneak away from the jellyfish by telling him that he had put his liver in a jar in the forest and offered to go and get it. As the jellyfish came back and told Ryūjin what had happened, Ryūjin became so angry that he beat the jellyfish until its bones were crushed.

=== The Tale of Tawara Tōda ===
One myth involves Ryūjin asking a man by the name of Tawara Tōda to help him get rid of a Ōmukade attacking his kingdom. Tawara Tōda agrees to help Ryūjin and accompanies him back to his home. When Tawara Tōda killed the Ōmukade, Ryūjin awarded him with legendary armours and swords, undiminishing rolls of silk, an inexhaustable bag of rice, and a bell made of crimson copper which was later hung at Miidera to tell the hour.

=== Empress Jingū ===
According to legend, the Empress Jingū was able to carry out her attack into Korea with the help of Ryūjin's Tide jewels. Some versions of the legend say that Empress Jingū asked Isora to go down to Ryūjin's palace and retrieve the Tide jewels.

Upon confronting the Korean navy, Jingū threw the Kanju (干珠, "tide-ebbing jewel") into the sea, and the tide receded. The Korean fleet was stranded, and the men got out of their ships. Jingū then threw down the Manju (満珠, "tide-flowing jewel") and the water rose, drowning the Korean soldiers.

== Family ==
Ryūjin was the father of the beautiful princess Otohime who appears in the tale of Urashima Tarō, Otohime (Princess Oto)'s name consists of the character also read otsu meaning "No. 2", implying that she should also have an elder sister named "Kohime".

== Worship ==
Ryūjin shinkō (竜神信仰, "dragon god faith") is a form of Shinto religious belief that worships dragons as water kami. It is connected with agricultural rituals, rain prayers, and the success of fishermen.

The god has shrines across Japan and especially in rural areas where fishing and rains for agriculture are important for local communities.

== In art ==
Ryūjin or Ryūo in art

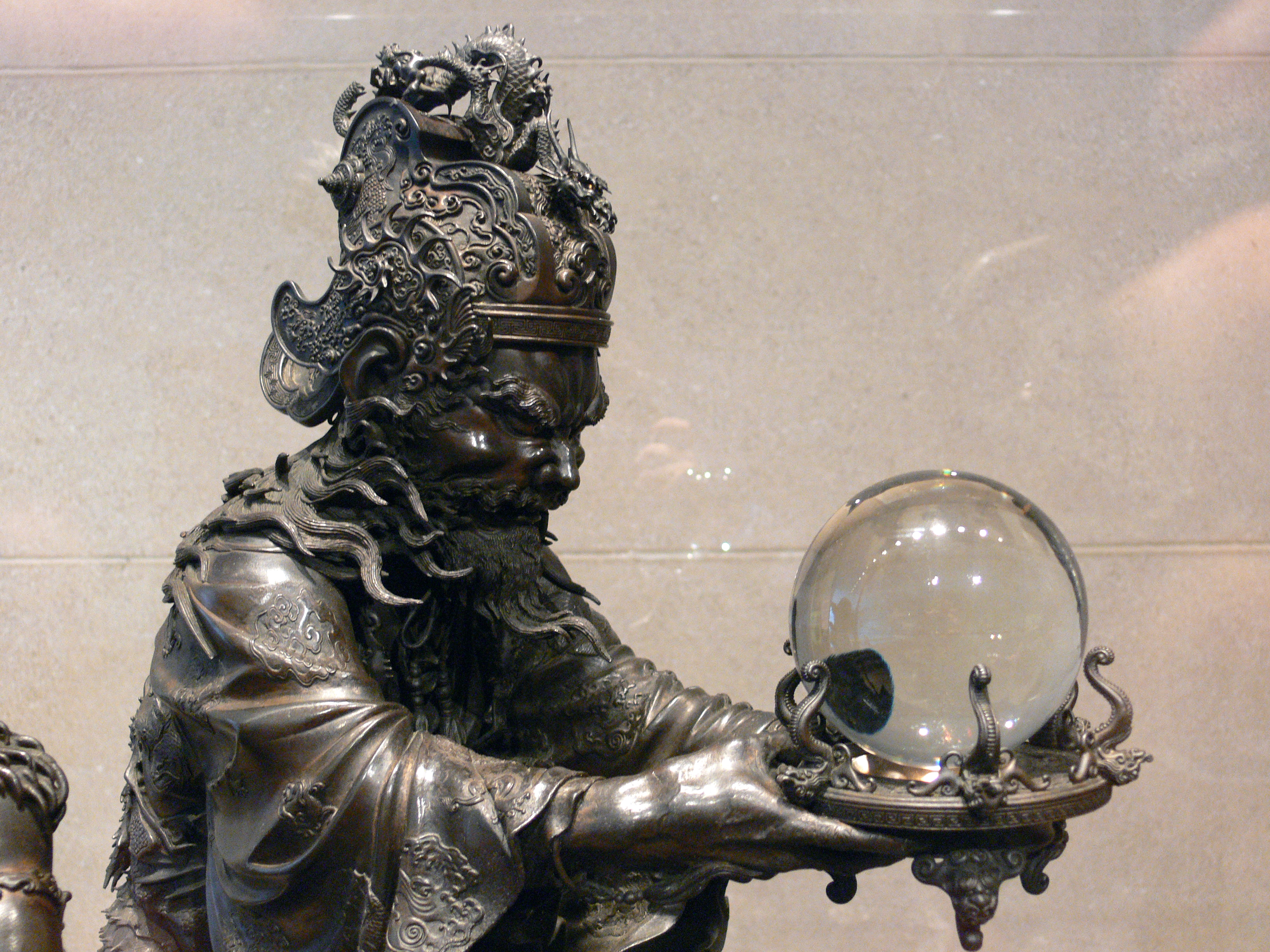
The Dragon King part of a statue representing "Takenouchi no Sukune Meeting the Dragon King of the Sea", dated 1875–1879, Japan.

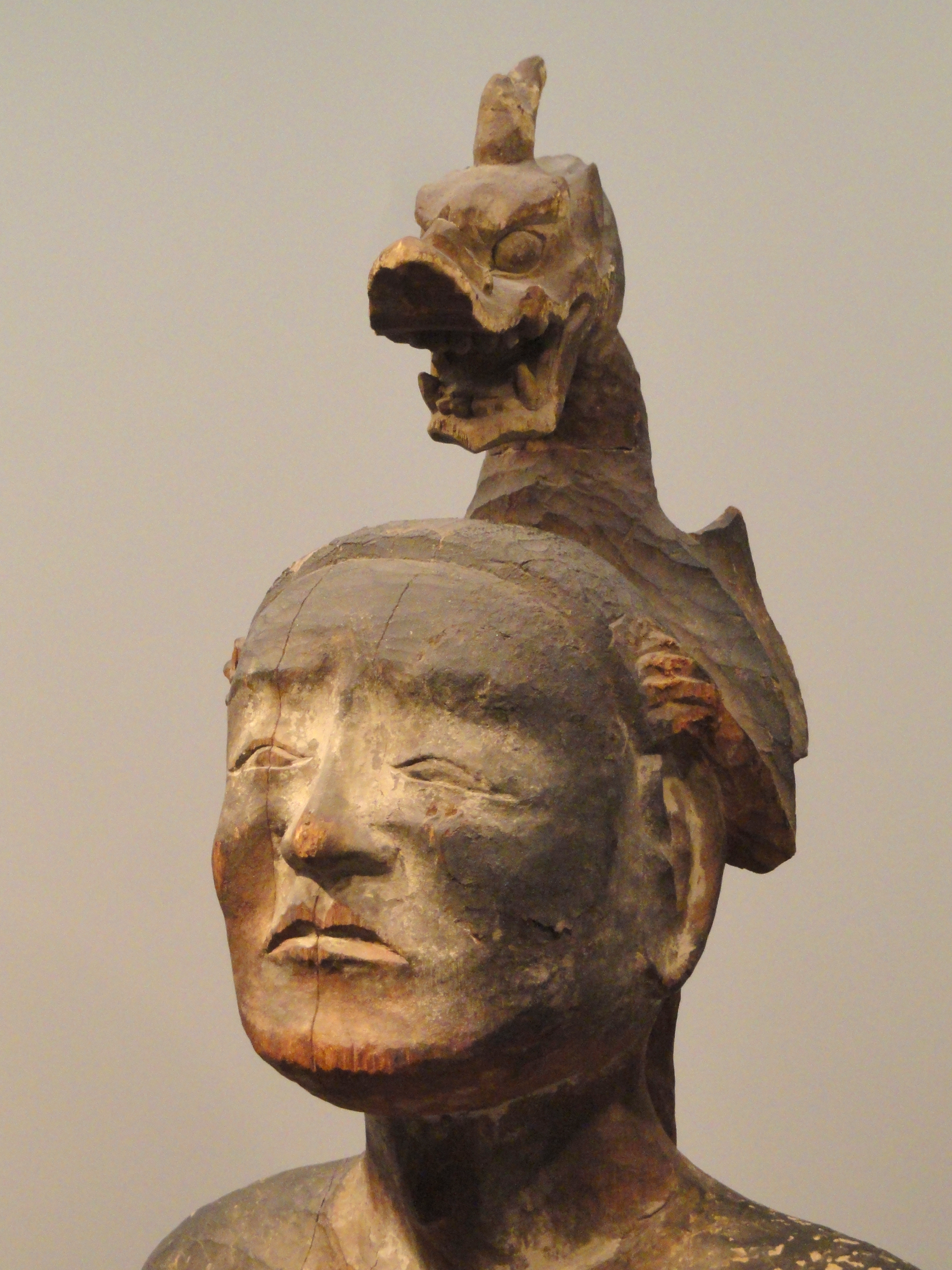
Dragon King sculpture with residual traces of pigment, dated 11th–12th century, Japan.
