= Tide jewels =

Magical gems in Japanese mythology

In Japanese mythology, the two tide jewels, named hirutama/kanju (干珠; "[tide-]ebbing jewel") and mitsutama/manju (満珠; "[tide-]flowing jewel"), were magical gems that the Sea God used to control the tides.

The earliest texts record an ancient myth that the Sea Deity (海神, Watatsumi) presented the tide jewels to his son-in-law Hoori aka Yamasachihiko (Prince Luck-of-the-Mountain).

Later Japanese writings refers to the tide jewels as being in the possession of the Dragon God (龍神, Ryūjin) or Dragon King or being housed in his Dragon Palace (龍宮, Ryūgū), where the myth of the loan of these jewels became attached to the conquest of Korea by Empress Jingū.

== Terminology ==
Shiohiru-tama (潮干る珠) "ebb gem" and Shiomitsu-tama (潮満つ珠) "flow gem" are the full, archaic "tide jewel" names, prefixed with shio (潮; "tide; flow; salt water"); they are also called shio-tama and mitsu-tama respectively, for short.

The short names can be possibly be read as kanju (干珠; lit. "ebb jewel") and manju (満珠; lit. "flow jewel") in on'yomi or Sino-Japanese reading. (Note: These Japanese compounds combine kan 干 (cf. 乾) "dry up; drain off; ebb (tides); recede; oppose" and man 満 "fill; full; rise (tides); fulfill; satisfy" with ju, shu, or tama 珠 "gem; jewel; precious stone; pearl; bead". Compare the reversible compounds kanman 干満 and mankan 満干 or michihi 満ち干 meaning "ebb and flow; high and low tides; the tides".)

== Early references ==
Two Nara period (710–794 CE) historical texts record myths that the Sea God presented the kanju and manju to Hoori, and a Kamakura period (1192–1333 CE) text says the legendary Empress Jingū used the tide jewels to conquer a Korean kingdom in 200 CE.

The tide jewels are central to "The Lost Fishhook" legend about the fisherman Hoderi and hunter Hoori, two brothers who argued over replacing a lost fishhook. Hoori went searching to the bottom of the sea, where he met and married Toyotama-hime, the daughter of the dragon Sea God. After living three years in the undersea Ryūgū-jō 竜宮城 "dragon palace castle", Ryūjin presented Hoori with his brother's fishhook and the tide jewels, and arranged for him to take his sea-dragon bride back to land.

=== Kojiki ===
The c. 680 CE Kojiki 古事記 "Record of Ancient Matters" uses the archaic names shiomitsu-tama 潮満珠 "tide-flowing jewel" and shiohiru-tama 潮干珠 "tide-ebbing jewel" in two consecutive passages.

The first describes the sea-god's advice to Hoori about how to confront his duplicitous brother Hoderi.

"What thou shalt say when thou grantest this fish-hook to thine elder brother [is as follows]: 'This fish-hook is a big hook, an eager hook, a poor hook, a silly hook.' Having [thus] spoken, bestow it with thy back hand. Having done thus, – if thine elder brother make high fields, do Thine Augustness make low fields; and if thine elder brother make low fields, do Thine Augustness make high fields. If thou do thus, thine elder brother will certainly be impoverished in the space of three years, owing to my ruling the water. If thine elder brother, incensed at thy doing thus, should attack thee, put forth the tide-flowing jewel to drown him. If he express grief, put forth the tide-ebbing jewel to let him live. Thus shalt thou harass him." With these words, [the Sea-Deity] gave [to His Augustness Fire-Subside] the tide-flowing jewel and the tide-ebbing jewel, – two in all, – and forthwith summoned together all the crocodiles, and asked them, saying: "The Sky's-Sun-Height, august child of the Heaven's-Sun-Height, is now about to proceed out to the Upper-Land. Who will in how many days respectfully escort him, and bring back a report?" So each according to the length of his body in fathoms spoke, fixing [a certain number of] days, – one of them, a crocodile one fathom [long], saying: "I will escort him, and come back in one day." So then [the Sea-Deity] said to the crocodile one fathom [long]: "If that be so, do thou respectfully escort him. While crossing the middle of the sea, do not alarm him!" Forthwith he seated him upon the crocodile's head, and saw him off. So [the crocodile] respectfully escorted him home in one day, as he had promised.

This "crocodile" translates wani (鰐), a legendary Japanese dragon and sea-monster also translated as "shark". At the end of Toyotama-hime's pregnancy, she asks Hoori not to look at her during childbirth (hinting at shapeshifting), but he looks and sees her true shape of a dragon (Kojiki) or a wani (Nihongi).

The subsequent passage describes Hoori using the tide jewels to force his brother's submission.

Hereupon [His Augustness Fire-Subside] gave the fish-hook [to his elder brother], exactly according to the Sea-Deity's words of instruction. So thenceforward [the elder brother] became poorer, and poorer, and, with renewed savage intentions, came to attack him. When he was about to attack [His Augustness Fire-Subside, the latter] put forth the tide-flowing jewel to drown him; on his expressing grief, he put forth the tide-ebbing jewel to save him. When he had thus been harassed, he bowed his head, saying: "I henceforward will be Thine Augustness's guard by day and night, and respectfully serve thee."

=== Nihongi ===
The c. 720 CE Nihon shoki 日本書紀 "Chronicles of Japan" or Nihongi 日本紀 has several references to tide jewels. Chapter 2 ("The Age of the Gods", Part 2) includes five versions of the Hoori-Hoderi myth, three of which mention the tide jewels. Chapter 8 ("Emperor Chūai") has a legend that Empress Jingū found a Buddhist nyoi-ju 如意珠 lit. "as-one-wishes jewel", and Chapter 9 ("Empress Jingū") tells how the Sea God and Wind God helped her to conquer the Korean kingdom of Silla.

Three of the five "Lost Fishhook" myth versions specifically mention Hoori using the tide jewels to control the tides and cause his fisherman brother Hoderi to submit. The other two variations involve controlling winds rather than tides. In the second version, the Sea God promises to directly control the sea winds; "if thy brother cross the sea, I will then assuredly stir up the blasts and billows, and make them overwhelm and vex him." In the fifth version, the water deity tells Hoori that whistling can create winds (cf. tides from Tangaroa's breathing); "Now that which raises the wind is whistling. If thou doest so, I will forthwith stir up the wind of the offing and the wind of the shore, and will overwhelm and vex him with the scurrying waves."

The first Nihongi version is consistent with the Kojiki, except that Hoori learns that Toyotama-hime is pregnant before, instead of after, returning home to Japan. It uses manju and kanju once each. The Sea God said.

"If the Heavenly Grandchild desires to return to his country I will send him back." So he gave him the fish-hook which he had found, and in doing so instructed him, saying: "When thou givest this fish-hook to thy elder brother, before giving to him call to it secretly, and say, "A poor hook." He further presented to him the jewel of the flowing tide and the jewel of the ebbing tide, and instructed him, saying: "If thou dost dip the tide-flowing jewel, the tide will suddenly flow, and therewithal thou shalt drown thine elder brother. But in case thy elder brother should repent and beg forgiveness, if, on the contrary, thou dip the tide-ebbing jewel, the tide will spontaneously ebb, and therewithal thou shalt save him. If thou harass him in this way, thy elder brother will of his own accord render submission." … When Hiko-hoho-demi no Mikoto returned to his palace, he complied implicitly with the instructions of the Sea-God, and the elder brother, Ho-no-susori no Mikoto, finding himself in the utmost straits, of his own accord admitted his offence, and said: "Henceforward I will be thy subject to perform mimic dances for thee. I beseech thee mercifully to spare my life." Thereupon he at length yielded his petition, and spared him.

The third version of the myth mentions the tide jewels 9 times, and elaborates the feature of mind control.

I am rejoiced in my inmost heart that the Heavenly Grandchild has now been graciously pleased to visit me. When shall I ever forget it? So he took the jewel which when thought of makes the tide to flow, and the jewel which when thought of makes the tide to ebb, and joining them to the fish-hook, presented them, saying: 'Though the Heavenly Grandchild may be divided from me by eightfold windings (of road), I hope that we shall think of each other from time to time. Do not therefore throw them away.' And he taught him, saying: 'When thou givest this fish-hook to thy elder brother, call it thus: 'A hook of poverty, a hook of ruin, a hook of downfall.' When thou hast said all this, fling it away to him with thy back turned, and deliver it not to him face to face. If thy elder brother is angry, and has a mind to do thee hurt, then produce the tide-flowing jewel and drown him therewith. As soon as he is in peril and appeals for mercy, bring forth the tide-ebbing jewel and therewith save him. If thou dost vex him in this way, he will of his own accord become thy submissive vassal!' Now Hiko-hoho-demi no Mikoto, having received the jewels and the fish-hook, came back to his original palace, and followed implicitly the teaching of the Sea-God. First of all he offered his elder brother the fish-hook. His elder brother was angry and would not receive it. Accordingly the younger brother produced the tide-flowing jewel, upon which the tide rose with a mighty overflow, and the elder brother was drowning. Therefore he besought his younger brother, saying: 'I will serve thee as thy slave. I beseech thee, spare my life.' The younger brother then produced the tide-ebbing jewel, whereupon the tide ebbed of its own accord, and the elder brother was restored to tranquility. After this the elder brother changed his former words, and said: 'I am thy elder brother. How can an elder brother serve a younger brother?' Then the younger brother produced the tide-flowing jewel, which his elder brother seeing, fled up to a high mountain. Thereupon the tide also submerged the mountain. The elder brother climbed a lofty tree, and thereupon the tide also submerged the tree. The elder brother was now at an extremity, and had nowhere to flee to. So he acknowledged his offence, saying: 'I have been in fault. In future my descendants for eighty generations shall serve thee as thy mimes in ordinary. [One version has' dog-men.'] I pray thee, have pity on me.' Then the younger brother produced the tide-ebbing jewel, whereupon the tide ceased of its own accord. Hereupon the elder brother saw that the younger brother was possessed of marvelous powers, and at length submitted to serve him.

The condensed fourth version mentions each tide jewel twice.

'When thou givest this to thy elder brother thou must recite the following : "A big hook, an eager hook, a poor hook, a silly hook." After saying all this, fling it to him with a back-handed motion.' Then he summoned together the sea-monsters, and inquired of them, saying: 'The Grandchild of the Heavenly Deity is now about to take his departure homewards. In how many days will you accomplish this service? 'Then all the sea-monsters fixed each a number of days according to his own length. Those of them which were one fathom long of their own accord said: 'In the space of one day we will accomplish it.' The one-fathom sea-monsters were accordingly sent with him as his escort. Then he gave him two precious objects, the tide-flowing jewel and the tide-ebbing jewel, and taught him how to use them. He further instructed him, saying: 'If thy elder brother should make high fields, do thou make puddle fields; if thy elder brother make puddle fields, do thou make high fields. In this manner did the Sea-God in all sincerity lend him his aid. Now Hiko-hoho-demi no Mikoto, when he returned borne, followed implicitly the God's instructions, and acted accordingly. When the younger brother produced the tide-flowing jewel, the elder brother forthwith flung up his hands in the agony of drowning. But when, on the other hand, he produced the tide-ebbing jewel, he was relieved, and recovered. After that Hi no susori no Mikoto pined away from day to day, and lamented, saying: 'I have become impoverished.' So he yielded submission to his younger brother.

The Nihongi chapters on legendary Emperor Chūai (supposedly r. 192–200 CE) and his shamanistic Empress Jingū (r. 201–269 CE) combine myths about Japanese kanju and manju tide jewels with Indian nyoi-ju 如意珠 "cintamani; wish-fulfilling jewels".

The former context says that in the 2nd year (193 CE) of Chūai's reign, he started an expedition against the Kumaso rebellion in southern Kyūshū and made preparations at Toyora (Nagato Province). In the 7th month, "The Empress anchored in the harbour of Toyora. On this day the Empress found in the sea a Nyoi pearl." (Aston notes that, "A Buddhist term is of course an anachronism in this narrative.") In the 8th year (199 CE), they sailed to Tsukushi (Chikuzen and Chikugo Provinces), and their ships were met by a Kuma-Wani 熊鰐 "bear shark/crocodile" sea-monster with a decorated sakaki tree (see tamagushi). Both ships encountered problems with divinely-controlled tides and grounded in the harbor at Oka (Chikuzen), resonating with the tide jewels myth.

8th year, Spring, 1st month, 4th day. The Emperor proceeded to Tsukushi. At this time Kuma-wani, the ancestor of the Agata-nushi of Oka, hearing of the Emperor's arrival, pulled up beforehand a 500-branched Sakaki tree, which he set up on the bows of a nine-fathom ship. On the upper branches he hung a white-copper mirror, on the middle branches he hung a ten-span sword, and on the lower branches he hung Yasaka jewels. With these he went out to meet him at the Bay of Saha in Suwo, and presented to him a fish-salt-place. In doing so, he addressed the Emperor, saying: "Let the Great Ferry from Anato to Mukatsuno be its Eastern Gate and the Great Ferry of Nagoya be its Western Gate. Let the Islands of Motori and Abe and none else be the august baskets: let the Island of Shiba be divided and made the august pans: let the Sea of Sakami be the salt-place." He then acted as the Emperor's pilot. Going round Cape Yamaga, he entered the Bay of Oka. But in entering the harbour, the ship was unable to go forward. So he inquired of Kuma-wani, saying: "We have heard that thou, Kuma-wani, hast come to us with an honest heart. Why does the ship not proceed?" Kuma-wani addressed the Emperor, saying: "It is not the fault of thy servant that the august ship is unable to advance. At the entrance to this bay there are two Deities, one male and the other female. The male Deity is called Oho-kura-nushi, the female Deity is called Tsubura-hime. It must be owing to the wish of these Deities." The Emperor accordingly prayed to them, and caused them to be sacrificed to, appointing his steersman Iga-hiko, a man of Uda in the province of Yamato, as priest. So the ship was enabled to proceed. The Empress entered in a different ship by the Sea of Kuki. As the tide was out, she was unable to go on. Then Kuma-wani went back and met the Empress by way of Kuki. Thereupon he saw that the august ship made no progress, and he was afraid. He hastily made a fish-pond and a bird-pond, into which he collected all the fishes and birds. When the Empress saw these fishes and birds sporting, her anger was gradually appeased, and with the flowing tide she straightway anchored in the harbour of Oka.

The latter context says that in the 9th year (200 CE), the emperor wanted to invade Kumaso, but the gods told the empress that he should instead invade Shiragi (Silla) on the Korean peninsula. After refusing to believe her prophecy, he died prematurely and she assumed control as regent for as yet unborn Emperor Ōjin. Empress Jingū worshiped and sacrificed to the gods, and conducted a type of fishhook divination in Hizen Province. She "bent a needle and made of it a hook"; note that Japanese hari 針 means both "needle; pin" and "fishhook") and prayed that catching a fish foretold conquering Silla. A rare trout hooked itself, and she declared, "It is a strange thing." Later that year, the legend says a divine tsunami propelled the Japanese fleet across the Sea of Japan.

Sail was set from the harbor of Wani [Tsushima]. Then the Wind-God made a breeze to spring up, and the Sea-God uplifted the billows. The great fishes of the ocean, every one, came to the surface and encompassed the ships. Presently a great wind blew from a favourable quarter on the ships under sail, and following the waves, without the labour of the oar or helm, they arrived at Silla. The tide-wave following the ships reached far up into the interior of the country.

According to this legend, which is unsupported by historical evidence, the King of Silla surrendered after being astonished by the tsunami and terrified by the invading fleet.

=== Mizukagami ===
The c. 1195 CE Mizukagami 水鏡 "Water Mirror", which is a collection of historical tales, confabulates the Nihongi legends about the tide jewels and Jingū conquering the Koreans. This text uses some different names, Sāgara 沙竭羅 (one of the 8 Dragon Kings) for the Sea God, and Koryo 句麗 or Koma 蓋馬 for the Korean kingdom Goguryeo.

In the year 200, when the Empress Jingō (200–269) arrived in Korea, she took some sea water in her hand and prayed from far to the god of Kashima (in Hitachi) and Kasuga (Takemikazuchi ...). Then came the gods of Kasuga and Sumiyoshi and Suwa, clad in armour and with helmets on their heads, to the Empress's ship. Kasuga sent the Great God (Daimyōjin) of Kawakami as a messenger to the Dragon-palace (龍宮, ryūgū) at the bottom of the sea, and this mighty river-god took the "pearl of ebb" and the "pearl of flood" from the Great Dragon-king Sāgara and brought them with him to the surface. While the Korean warships were put up in battle array, the pearl of ebb, thrown into the sea, made the water suddenly dry up. Then the king of Koma entered the sea-bed with his troops in order to destroy the Japanese fleet; but as soon as he did so the god of Kawakami, following Kasuga's order, threw the pearl of flood into the sea, and behold, all of a sudden the water rose tremendously and filled the whole sea-bed. The frightened troops all prayed for their lives, for the water covered even the whole of Koma land. Then the pearl of ebb was thrown into the sea again, and the water sank. So the Empress by Kasuga's assistance conquered the enemy's army without shedding a single drop of blood, and obtained three ships laden with tributes and treasures from the king of Koma.

== Tamatori-hime ==
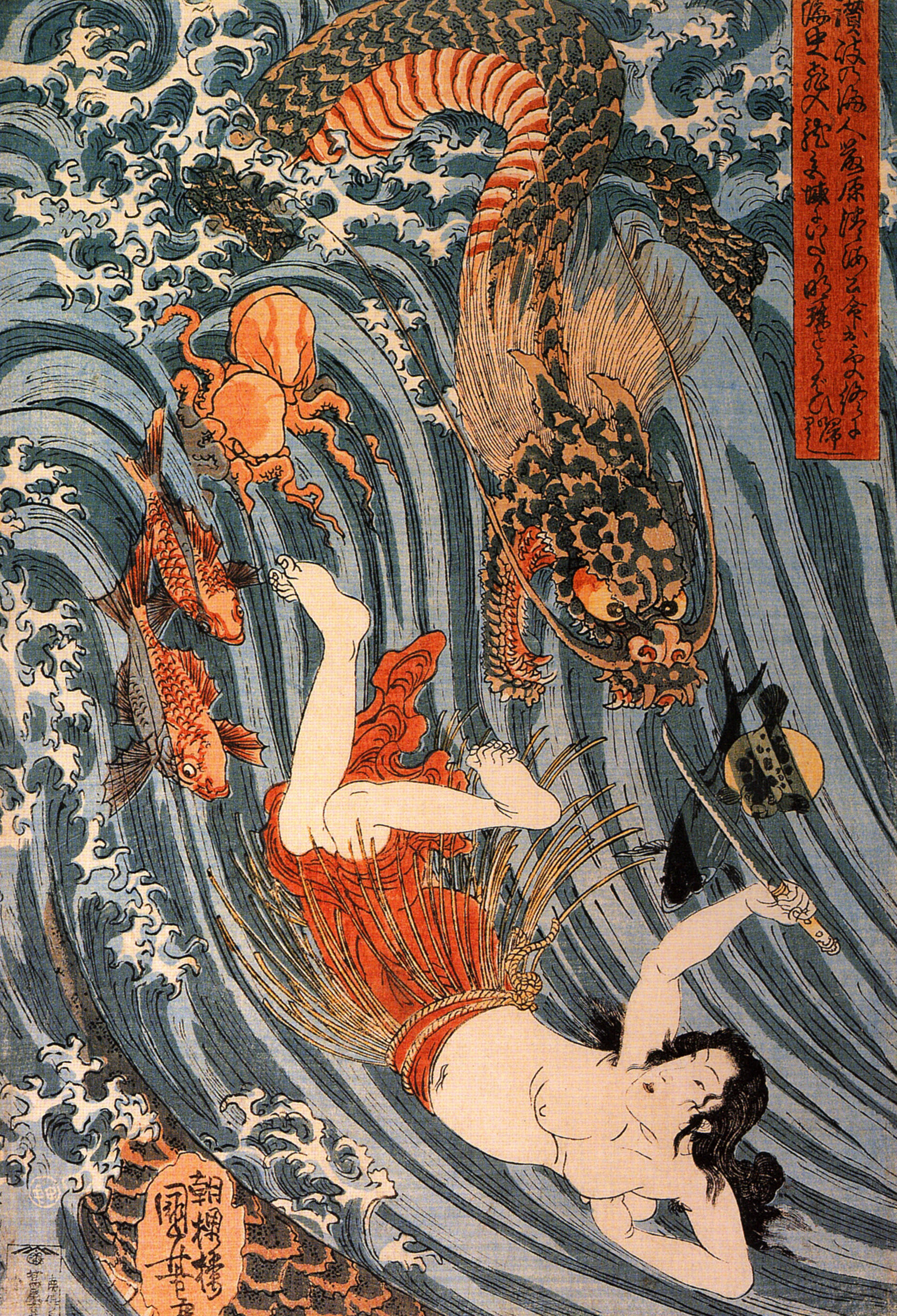
Princess Tamatori steals Ryūjin's tide jewels, by Utagawa Kuniyoshi.

The fable of Tamatori-hime 玉取姫 "Princess Jewel Taker", which was a favorite ukiyo-e subject of Utagawa Kuniyoshi, is a variation of the Hoori and Toyatama-hime love story. Tamatori was supposedly an ama diver who married Fujiwara no Fuhito and recovered a precious jewel that the Sea God stole.

The legend of Princess Tamatori (Tamatorihime), or Ama, developed around the historical figure Fujiwara no Kamatari (614–69), who was the founder of the powerful Fujiwara clan. Upon Kamatari’s death, the Tang dynasty emperor, who had received Kamatari’s beautiful daughter as a consort, sent three priceless treasures to Japan in order to comfort his grieving lover by honoring her father. One of the treasures, a pearl, was stolen by the dragon king during a storm on its way to Japan in the inlet of Fusazaki. Kamatari’s son Fujiwara no Fuhito (659–720) went in search of the pearl to the isolated area where he met and married a beautiful pearl diver named Ama, who bore him a son. Ama, full of love for their son, vowed to help recover the stolen pearl. After many failed attempts, Ama was finally successful when the dragon and grotesque creatures guarding it were lulled to sleep by music. Upon reclaiming the treasure, she came under pursuit by the awakened sea creatures. She cut open her breast to place the pearl inside for safekeeping the resulting flow of blood clouded the water and aided her escape. She died from the resulting wound but is revered for her selfless act of sacrifice for her husband Fuhito and their son.

== Local lore ==
Manju Shima 満珠島 "tide-flowing jewel island" and Kanju Shima 干珠島 "tide-ebbing jewel island" are uninhabited islets in the Kanmon Straits near Chōfu 長府 in Shimonoseki, Yamaguchi. In the 1185 CE Battle of Dan-no-ura during the Genpei War, the Minamoto (Genji) fleet defeated the Taira (Heike) fleet by taking advantage of the tides around these two islands.

Several Shinto shrines were allegedly repositories for the ancient tide jewels. The c. 1335 CE Usa hachiman no miya engi 宇佐八幡宮縁起 "History of the Hachiman Shrine at Usa" notes, "The two jewels are kept in the Kawakami-no Miya of Saga District, in Hizen Province. The jewel-of-ebb-tide is white, but the jewel-of-flood-tide is blue. Each is five sun [i.e., Chinese cun 寸] in length." Wheeler cites records that the tide jewels were preserved in the Uda Shrine around 1185 CE and the Kagoshima Shrine in 1916. In addition, the Ōwatatsumi-jinja 大海神社 in Sumiyoshi-ku, Osaka and the Mekari-jinja 和布刈神社 in Moji-ku, Kitakyūshū purportedly housed the original tide jewels.

== Parallels ==
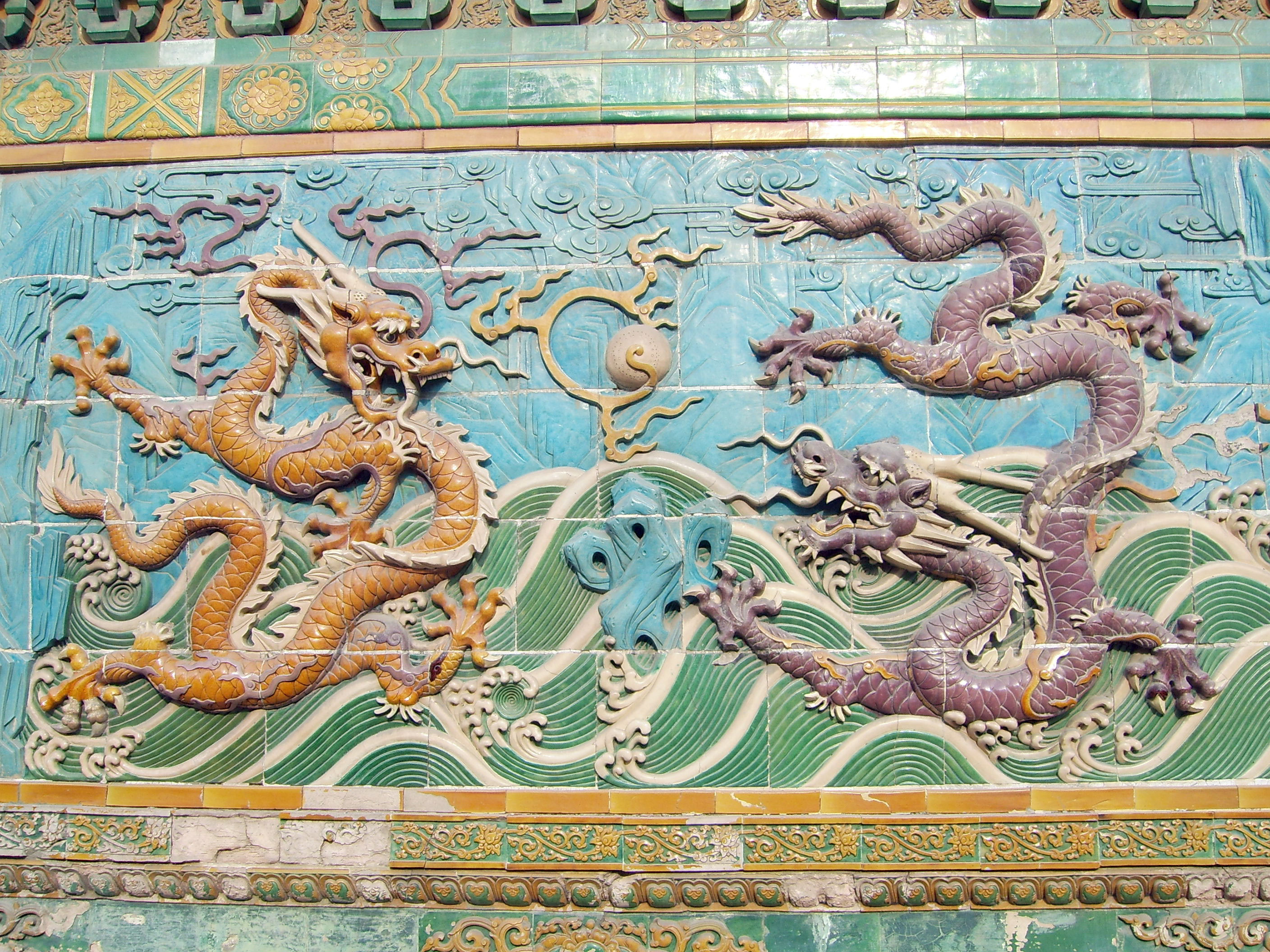
Chinese dragons fighting over a jewel

Tide jewels are connected with the wani sea-monsters ("sharks" or "crocodiles") in early texts, but more connected with the Dragon God or Dragon King in later literature, as explained above.

Jewels, pearls, moons, and tides are common motifs among Indian, Chinese, and Japanese dragons.

The nyoi-ju 如意珠 "cintamani; wish-fulfilling jewel" in Japanese Buddhism, magic jewels of Nāga kings in Hindu mythology, and the pearl associations of Chinese dragons in Chinese mythology.

Indonesian mythology from the Kei Islands and Minahassa Peninsula strongly resemble the Japanese Hoori-Hoderi legend according to Visser, however, the tide-flowing jewel motif is replaced by torrential rain-making: "the hero of the Minahassa legend by his prayers caused the rain to come down in torrents upon his evil friend. "Several stories from the Pacific islands", adds Andrews, "involved controlling the tides with jewels owned by the dragon-king who guarded them in his palace under the waves.

== Reception ==
Japanese tide-jewels are well known in the West both as a legend, and an artistic motif.

== Eponymy ==
- In 1943, the Manju maru 満珠丸 and Kanju maru 干珠丸 Etorofu class coastal defense ships were named after the tide-jewel islands.
