= Dismissal of School on an October Afternoon =

1845 painting by Henry Inman

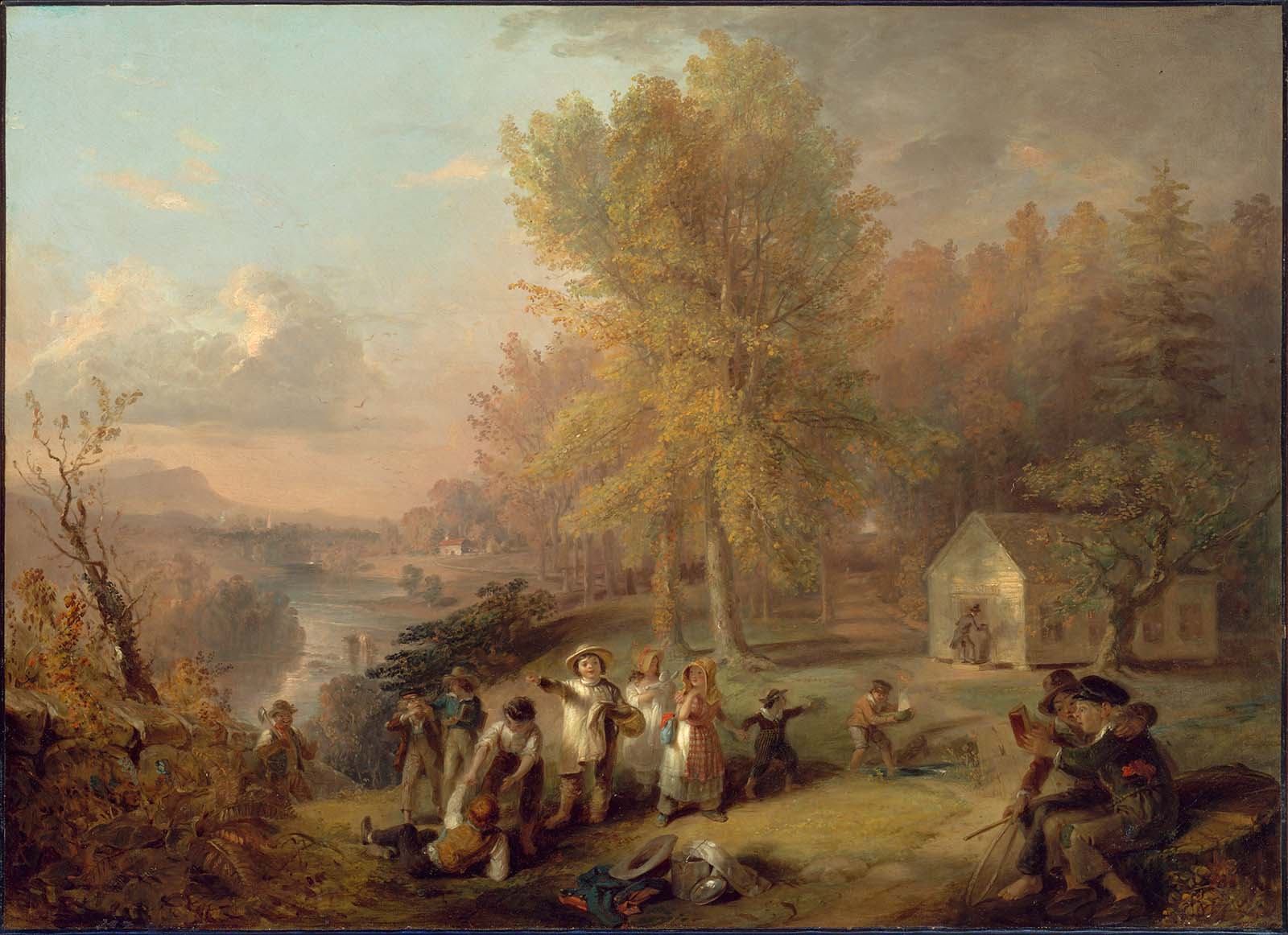
- Artist: Henry Inman
- Year: 1845
- Medium: Oil on canvas
- Dimensions: 66.04 cm × 90.8 cm (26.00 in × 35.7 in)
- Location: Museum of Fine Arts, Boston, Massachusetts

Dismissal of School on an October Afternoon was painted by Henry Inman. An elected founding member of the National Academy of Design, Inman was well known in the New York City art scene. Although predominately known for his portrait paintings, Henry Inman was also known for painting genre scenes and literary subjects. Commissioned by James Cozzens, this painting was finished on November 8, 1845, making it the final piece he completed before his death in January 1846. It is a culmination of his successful career, blending landscape, genre, and literary references.

== Painting ==
The painting depicts a scene of childhood in mid-1840s rural America. The sweeping view of the northeastern American landscape coupled with the romantic depiction of an autumn afternoon shows the influence of the Hudson River School. Inman alludes to Washington Irving's Legend of Sleepy Hollow, which was also set in the Hudson Valley.

Referencing the protagonist in Irving’s story, the painting’s teacher is Ichabod Crane, who is seen in the background at the schoolhouse's door. Scrawled across the doorframe is “I. Crane,” which viewers of the time would have recognized and connected to Irving’s story. In Irving's tale of this schoolteacher, Crane supposedly let the students out early one school day. At the left of the painting is an African American servant, who in Irving's story, brought Ichabod Crane a note inviting him to attend "a merry-making," which led to an early class dismissal. In Irving's story, the students "[burst] forth like a legion of young imps, yelping and racketing about the green in joy at their early emancipation." Perhaps this is why the children in the painting are so ecstatic with their wide grins and playful gestures. Their lunch pails and some clothing are strewn across the foreground of the painting, creating space for them to play with each other. Contrasting with Irving's tale, Inman creates an idealized scene of childhood; the schoolchildren are simultaneously having fun and appearing to be well-mannered and peaceful.

According to art historian William H. Gerdts, Inman was known for his kind portrayals of people; "He made young mothers more radiant, and children more idyllic, and old men more benevolent." With tinges of romanticism, Inman only portrayed the goodness in his themes, and encouraged other artists of his generation to “free themselves of rancor.” He was recounted as “one of Nature’s gentlemen” by his contemporary artists.

A few months before painting Dismissal of School on an October Afternoon, Inman had returned from a year abroad, during which he had studied his English contemporaries' landscape and genre paintings. Placing the scene in the rustic American countryside with references to Irving's story, Inman's painting is proudly nationalistic through its celebration of the idyllic American landscape. With genre scenes of childhood, Inman hoped to highlight the superiority of a rural childhood to an urban one.

== Exhibition history ==
Less than a month after his death, a memorial exhibition of his work opened on February 10, 1846 at the American Art-Union. This exhibition featured 126 of his works, including Dismissal of School on an October Afternoon. In a review of the exhibition, the August 1846 issue of The American Whig Review remarked, "rarely do we see a landscape so winning as this" one by Inman.

Over a century later, the painting was part of "The Art of Henry Inman" exhibit at the Smithsonian National Portrait Gallery from April 2–August 2, 1987. The exhibition featured over 100 works created by Inman and several portraits of him done by his contemporaries. Curated by William Gerdts, it was the first retrospective of his work since his 1846 memorial exhibit.

In 1992, this painting was featured in the "An Exhibit of American Painting, 1815–1865: from the M. and M. Karolik Collection at the Museum of Fine Arts, Boston."

== Related works ==
Dismissal from School on an October Afternoon was not Inman's only work influenced by Irving. Inman was particularly interested in Rip van Winkle. In 1823, he painted Rip Van Winkle Awakening from His Long Sleep. Several years later, Inman painted his James Henry Hackett as Rip Van Winkle. There is also an undated sketch titled Rip Van Winkle.

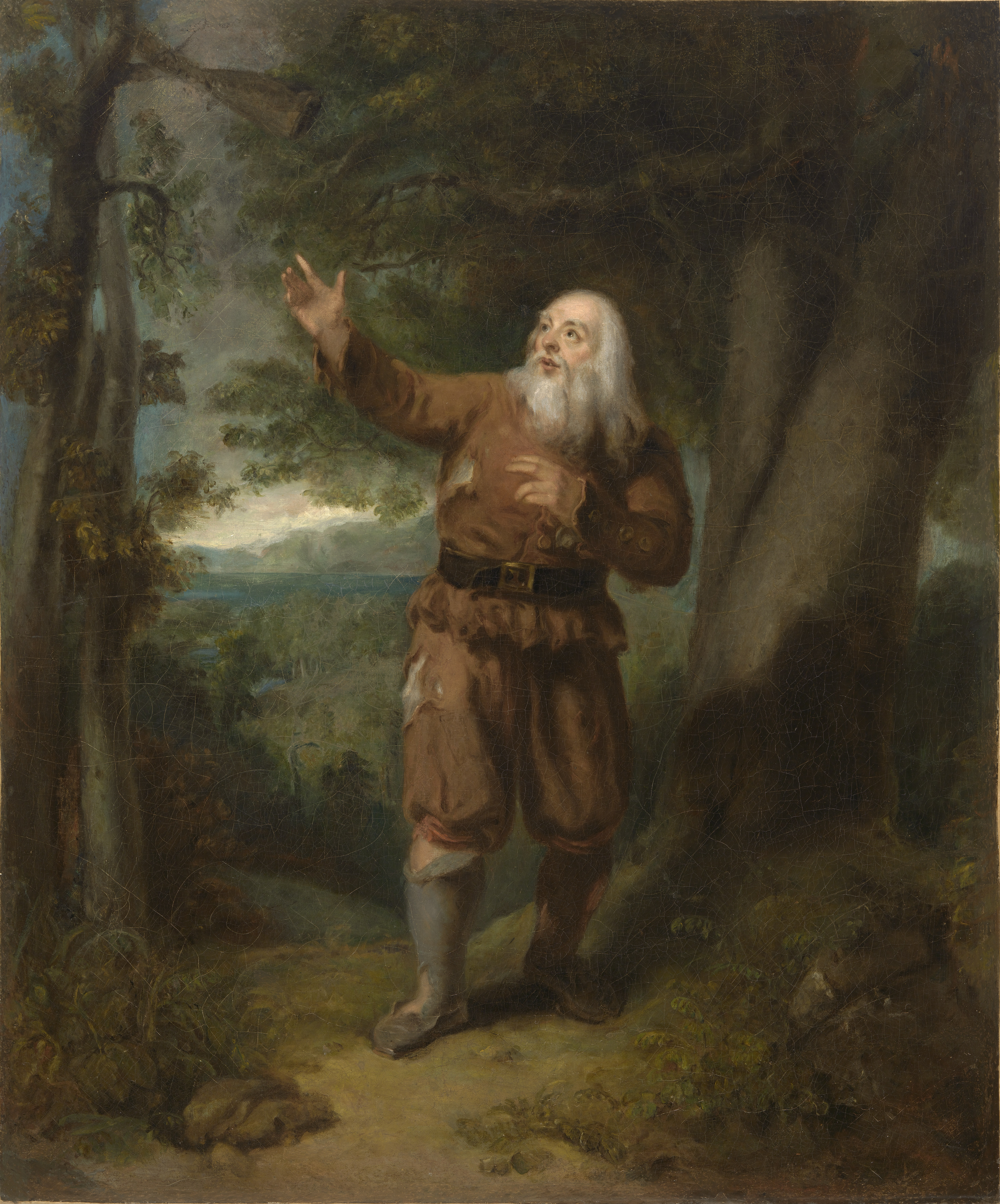
Mr. Hackett, in the Character of Rip Van Winkle, 1832, oil on canvas, National Portrait Gallery

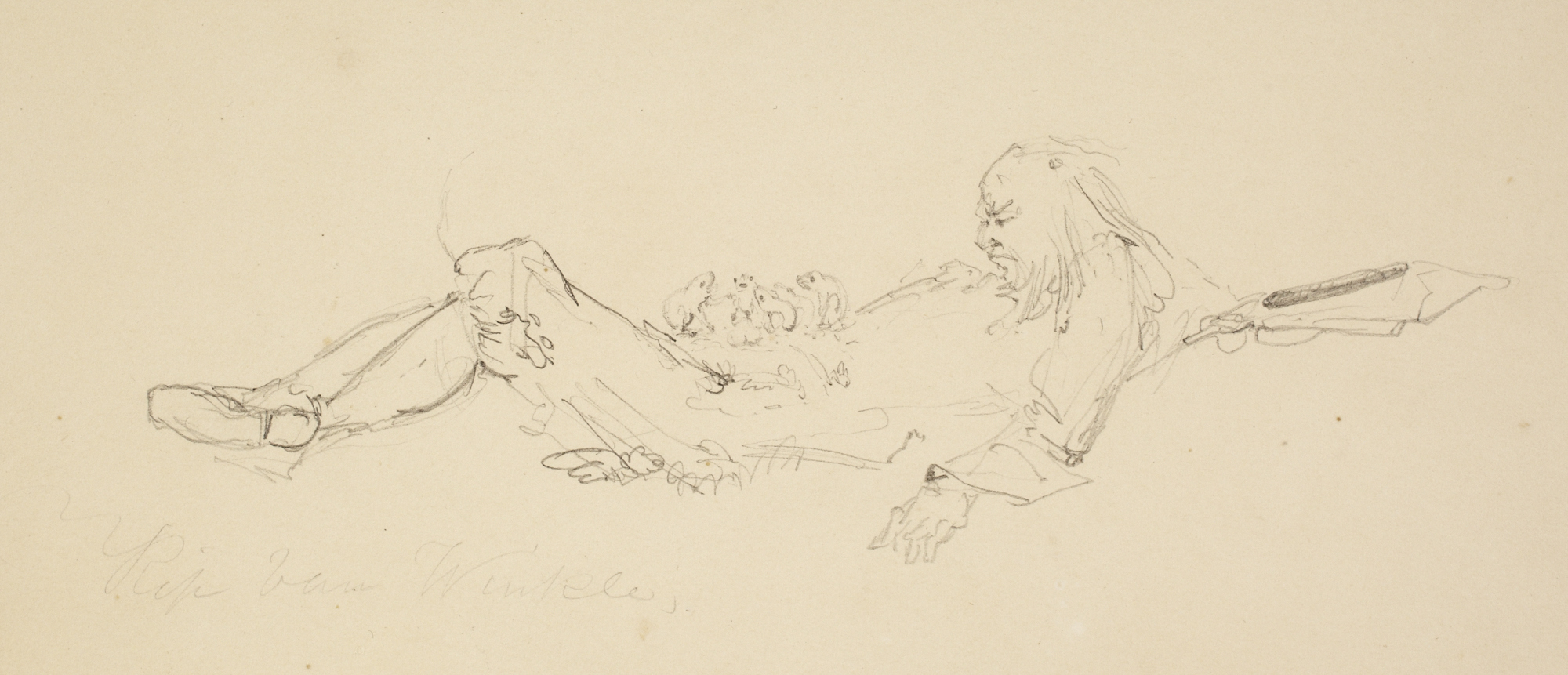
Rip van Winkle, Graphite on beige wove paper, Princeton University Art Museum

== Provenance ==
James Cozzens commissioned Dismissal from School on an October Afternoon. Ownership soon passed to William P. Jones. Jones wrote about the painting in the November 24, 1845 issue of the New York Evening Gazette. In 1870, art collector and bibliophile James Lenox bought the painting. It was displayed in his Lenox Library and included in the 1879 edition of the Gallery's Catalogue. The painting was likely displayed through 1892, as it also appeared in the 1885 and 1893 catalogues. After Lenox's death in 1895, the painting and the rest of the Lenox Library's art and book collection were donated to help form the New York Public Library. The painting was on display at the New York Public Library in 1897.

Like many other paintings that once belonged to the Lenox Library, the New York Public Library sold Inman's Dismissal of School on an October Afternoon. The painting was lot no. 192 in the April 14–16, 1943 sale at Parke-Bernet Galleries. Victor David Spark (1898-1991), an art dealer, bought the painting. That same year, Maxim Karolik acquired the painting. A well-known art collector of American art, Karolik and his wife, Martha, bequest the painting to the Museum of Fine Arts, Boston in 1948.

Upon request, the Museum of Fine Arts loaned the painting to the White House for the duration of President Jimmy Carter's term, where it hung in the bedroom of his daughter, Amy. After President Carter's term ended, the painting was returned to the Museum of Fine Arts where it can be seen on display.
