= John O'Brien Inman =

American painter (1828–1896)

John O'Brien Inman (1828–1896) was an American portrait, genre, and landscape painter. He was the son of Henry Inman and Jane Riker O'Brien. One of Inman's most recognizable works was Moonlight Skating, Central Park.
