= Pes-Ke-Le-Cha-Co (Henry Inman) =

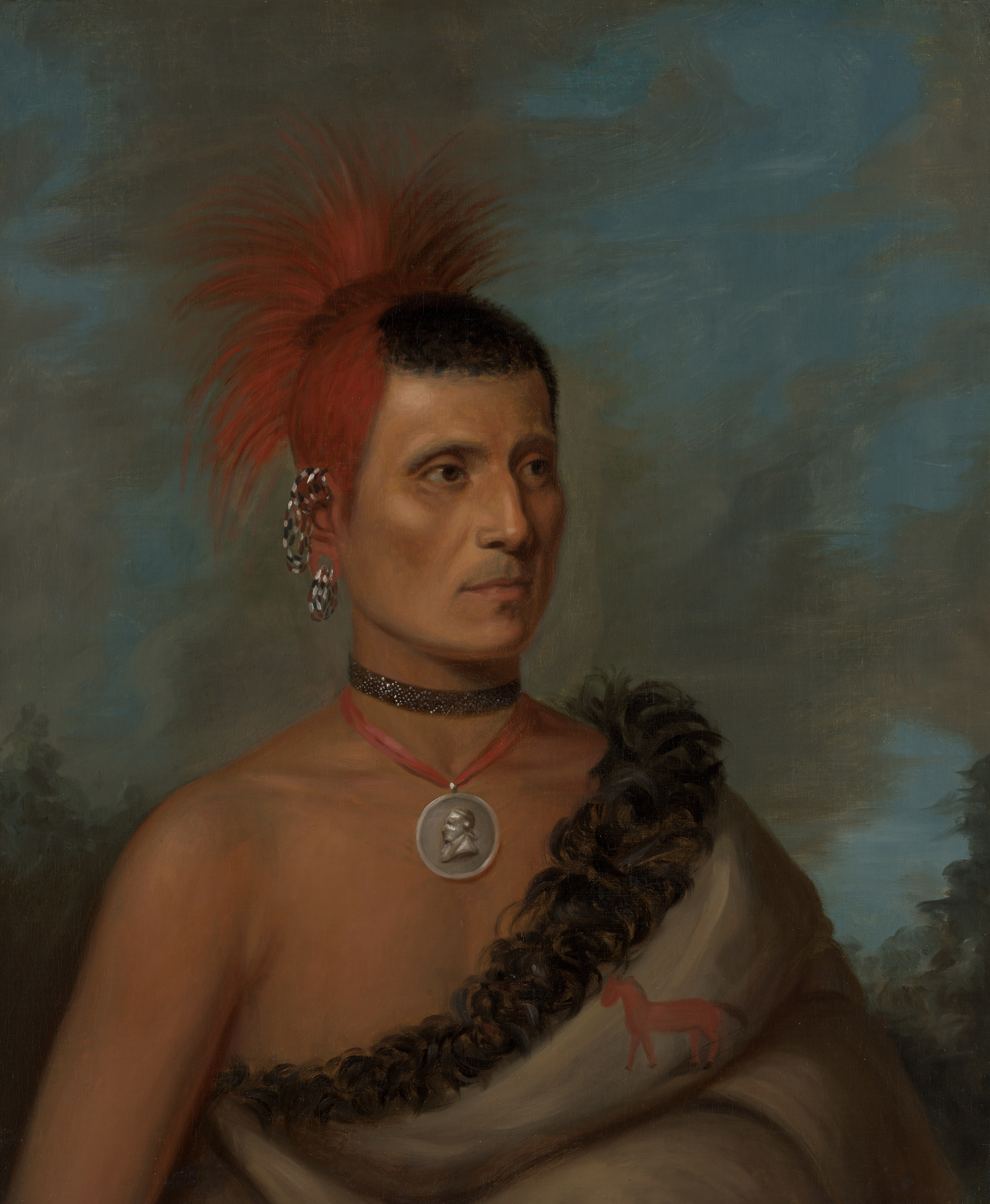
- Artist: Henry Inman
- Year: 1832
- Medium: Oil on canvas
- Dimensions: 76.2 cm × 63.5 cm (30.0 in × 25.0 in)
- Location: The Metropolitan Museum of Art; New York, New York

Pes-Ke-Le-Cha-Co is an oil painting by Henry Inman currently on display at the Metropolitan Museum of Art. It depicts Pawnee chief Pes-Ke-Le-Cha-Co as of 1832, painted as a copy of a now destroyed set of paintings by Charles Bird King. It was painted by Inman around 1832 to 1833.

Inman was an American artist who is well known for his portraits. He was asked by Thomas L. McKenney to copy over 100 oil paintings by King and translate them to his set of Native American chief biographies, History of the Indian Tribes of North America.
