= The Sketch Book of Geoffrey Crayon, Gent. =

Collection of short stories and essays by Washington Irving

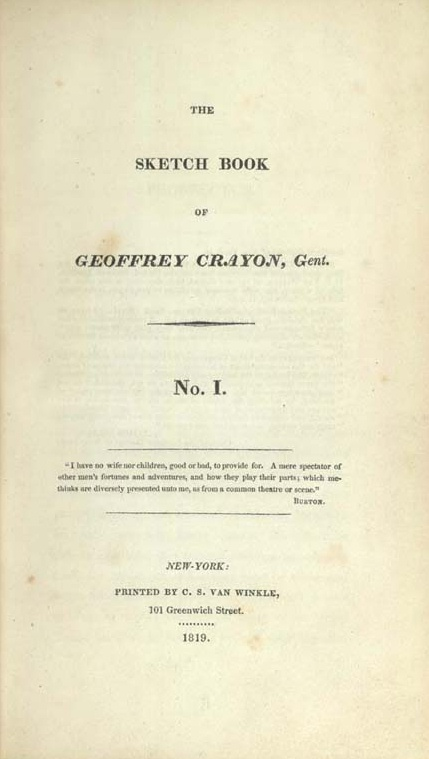
- Title page of the first edition
- Author: Washington Irving
- Original title: The Sketch Book of Geoffrey Crayon, Gent. No.1
- Illustrator: F. O. C. Darley
- Language: English
- Series: The Sketch Book
- Publisher: C. S. Van Winkle (USA)
- Publication date: June 23, 1819–July 1820
- Publication place: United States
- English publication date: June 23, 1819
- Media type: Hardback, 2 vols. & Paperback, 7 installments
- Pages: 392
- ISBN: 0-940450-14-3 (reprint)
- OCLC: 9412147
- Dewey Decimal: 818/.209 19
- LC Class: PS2052 1983
- Preceded by: A History of New York
- Followed by: Bracebridge Hall

The Sketch Book of Geoffrey Crayon, Gent., commonly referred to as The Sketch Book, is a collection of 34 essays and short stories written by the American author Washington Irving. It was published serially throughout 1819 and 1820. The collection includes two of Irving's best-known stories, attributed to the fictional Dutch historian Diedrich Knickerbocker: "The Legend of Sleepy Hollow" and "Rip Van Winkle". It also marks Irving's first use of the pseudonym Geoffrey Crayon, which he would continue to employ throughout his literary career.

The Sketch Book, along with James Fenimore Cooper's Leatherstocking Tales, was among the first widely read works of American literature in Britain and Europe. It also helped advance the reputation of American writers with an international audience.

== Overview ==
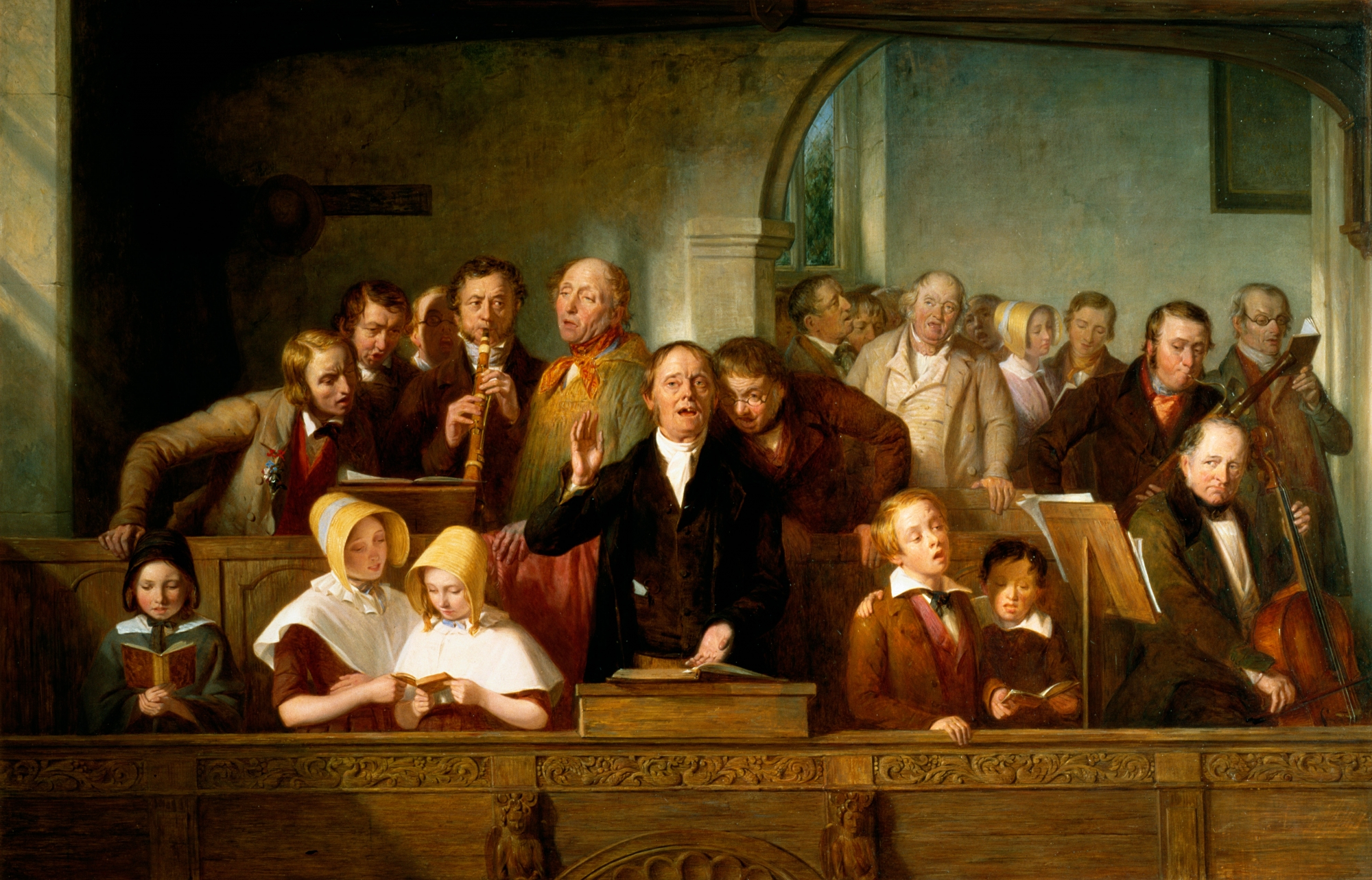
A Village Choir by Thomas Webster. An 1847 painting inspired by Christmas Day

Apart from "Rip Van Winkle" and "The Legend of Sleepy Hollow" – the pieces which made both Irving and The Sketch Book famous – the collection of tales includes "Roscoe", "The Broken Heart", "The Art of Book-making", "A Royal Poet", "The Spectre Bridegroom", "Westminster Abbey", "Little Britain", and "John Bull". Irving's stories were highly influenced by German folktales, with "The Legend of Sleepy Hollow" being inspired by a folktale retold by J. K. A. Musäus.

Stories range from the maudlin (such as "The Wife" and "The Widow and Her Son") to the picaresque ("Little Britain") and the comical ("The Mutability of Literature"), but the common thread running through The Sketch Book – and a key part of its attraction to readers – is the personality of Irving's pseudonymous narrator, Geoffrey Crayon. Erudite, charming, and never one to make himself more interesting than his tales, Crayon holds The Sketch Book together through the sheer power of his personality – and Irving would, for the rest of his life, seamlessly enmesh Crayon's persona with his own public reputation.

Little more than five of the 33 chapters deal with American subjects: the essays "English Writers on America", "The Traits of Indian Character", "Philip of Pokanoket: An Indian Memoir", and parts of "The Author's Account of Himself" and "The Angler"; and Knickerbocker's short stories "Rip Van Winkle" and "The Legend of Sleepy Hollow". Most of the remainder of the book consists of vignettes of English life and landscape, written with the author's characteristic charm while he lived in England. Irving wrote in a preface for a later edition:

It was not my intention to publish [the chapters] in England, being conscious that much of their contents could be interesting only to American readers, and, in truth, being deterred by the severity with which American productions had been treated by the British press.

== Background ==
Irving began writing the tales that would appear in The Sketch Book shortly after moving to England for the family business, in 1815. When the family business spiraled into bankruptcy throughout 1816 and 1817 – a humiliation that Irving never forgot – Irving was left with no job and few prospects. He tried at first to serve as an intermediary between American and English publishers, scouting for English books to reprint in America and vice versa, with only marginal success. In the autumn of 1818, his oldest brother William, sitting as a Congressman from New York, secured for him a political appointment as chief clerk to the Secretary of the U.S. Navy, and urged Irving to return home. Irving demurred, however, choosing to remain in England and take his chances as a writer. As he told friends and family back in the United States:

I now wish to be left for a little while entirely to the bent of my own inclination, and not agitated by new plans for subsistence, or by entreaties to come home . . . I am determined not to return home until I have sent some writings before me that shall, if they have merit, make me return to smiles, rather than skulk back to the pity of my friends.

Irving spent late 1818 and the early part of 1819 putting the final touches on the short stories and essays that he would eventually publish as The Sketch Book through 1819 and 1820.

== Contents ==
The Sketch Book initially existed in two versions: a seven-part serialized American version in paperback and a two-volume British version in hardback. The British edition contained three essays that were not included in the original American serialized format. Two more essays, "A Sunday in London" and "London Antiques", were added by Irving in 1848 for inclusion in the Author's Revised Edition of The Sketch Book for publisher George Putnam. At that time, Irving reordered the essays. Consequently, modern editions – based on Irving's own changes for the Author's Revised Edition – do not reflect the order in which the sketches originally appeared.

Modern editions of The Sketch Book contain all 34 stories, in the order directed by Irving in his Author's Revised Edition, as follows:

Title	Original Date of Publication	First Appeared In	Summary
"The Author's Account of Himself"	June 23, 1819	First American Installment	Irving introduces his pseudonymous narrator, Geoffrey Crayon, Gent.
"The Voyage"	June 23, 1819	First American Installment	Crayon details his ocean voyage from the United States to England. He details the dangers of traveling across the Atlantic to Europe, telling tales of ships lost at sea.
"Roscoe"	June 23, 1819	First American Installment	Irving's tribute to the English writer and historian William Roscoe, whom Irving had met in Liverpool.
"The Wife"	June 23, 1819	First American Installment	A sentimental piece in which the new wife of an impoverished gentleman teaches her husband that money can't buy happiness.
"Rip Van Winkle"	June 23, 1819	First American Installment	The tale of a henpecked husband who sleeps away twenty years in the Catskills – a story allegedly found among the papers of Irving's fictional historian Diedrich Knickerbocker. It is explained that Rip Van Winkle had been put under a spell after helping the spectre of Hendrick Hudson and his crew.
"English Writers on America"	July 31, 1819	Second American Installment	Crayon calls for a ceasefire of "the literary animosity daily growing between England and America".
"Rural Life in England"	July 31, 1819	Second American Installment	Crayon fondly describes English character and countrysides.
"The Broken Heart"	July 31, 1819	Second American Installment	Crayon relates the story of a young Irish woman (Sarah Curran) who wasted away "in a slow but hopeless decline" following the death of her true love (Robert Emmet).
"The Art of Bookmaking"	July 31, 1819	Second American Installment	A humorous piece in which literature is created as easily as a cook might make a stew. He specifically discusses how authors go to libraries to research previously written works—sometimes centuries old—and, partially or completely re-use the concepts discussed in these older works.
"A Royal Poet"	September 13, 1819	Third American Installment	A romanticized description of the literary King James I of Scotland and his writing a poem for his beloved, Lady Jane Beaufort.
"The Country Church"	September 13, 1819	Third American Installment	Crayon contrasts the quiet integrity of the nobleman with the offensive flashiness of the nouveau riche.
"The Widow and Her Son"	September 13, 1819	Third American Installment	An old Englishwoman tends to her dying son after he returns from his (military) conscription at sea.
"A Sunday in London"	1848	Author's Revised Edition	Crayon describes a day in London before, during, and after Sunday church services.
"The Boar's Head Tavern, East Cheap"	September 13, 1819	Third American Installment	A detective story of sorts, in which Crayon attempts to locate the real-life tavern of Shakespeare's Falstaff, the Boar's Head Inn, Eastcheap.
"The Mutability of Literature"	November 10, 1819	Fourth American Installment	Crayon discusses evolving literary tastes with a talking book he finds in the library of Westminster Abbey.
"Rural Funerals"	November 10, 1819	Fourth American Installment	Crayon discusses English funeral traditions.
"The Inn Kitchen"	November 10, 1819	Fourth American Installment	A description of the kind of hospitality visitors to the Netherlands can expect. One of the visitors staying in the same Inn as Geoffrey Crayon relays the subsequent tale, "The Spectre Bridegroom".
"The Spectre Bridegroom"	November 10, 1819	Fourth American Installment	A ghost story involving a betrothal, an armed robbery and a murder, as well as a happy ending.
"Westminster Abbey"	July 1820	English Edition, Volume 2	A contemplative tour of Westminster Abbey.
"Christmas"	January 1, 1820	Fifth American Installment	Crayon reflects on the meaning of Christmas and its celebration.
"The Stage-Coach"	January 1, 1820	Fifth American Installment	Crayon rides with the Bracebridge children to their country manor, Bracebridge Hall, and is invited to stay for Christmas.
"Christmas Eve"	January 1, 1820	Fifth American Installment	Crayon celebrates the holiday at the home of Squire Bracebridge.
"Christmas Day"	January 1, 1820	Fifth American Installment	Christmas festivities – allegedly in the old tradition – continue at Bracebridge Hall.
"Christmas Dinner"	January 1, 1820	Fifth American Installment	Crayon enjoys old English hospitality at the Bracebridge Christmas dinner table.
"London Antiques"	1848	Author's Revised Edition	Prowling London for antiques, Crayon instead stumbles upon the Charter House, home of "superannuated tradesmen and decayed householders"; one of whom gives him a history of "Little Britain" to read.
"Little Britain"	July 1820	English Edition, Volume 2	Crayon transcribes the history provided to him by the superannuated tradesman, which describes the heart of old London.
"Stratford-on-Avon"	July 1820	English Edition, Volume 2	A tribute to the life and work of William Shakespeare.
"Traits of Indian Character"	July 1820	English Edition, Volume 2	A sympathetic portrait of Native Americans, detailing how the White Man took advantage of and outright butchered Native Americans to obtain land.
"Philip of Pokanoket"	July 1820	English Edition, Volume 2	A heroic portrait of the Indian leader.
"John Bull"	March 15, 1820	Sixth American Installment	A tip of the hat to English character and custom.
"The Pride of the Village"	March 15, 1820	Sixth American Installment	A sentimental piece about true love lost, then found again, too late to save the life of a heartbroken young maiden.
"The Angler"	July 1820	English Edition, Volume 2	A character sketch of the English naturalist Izaak Walton.
"The Legend of Sleepy Hollow"	March 15, 1820	Sixth American Installment	Irving's tale of small-town school teacher Ichabod Crane and the Headless Horseman, again attributed to the fictional historian Diedrich Knickerbocker. This ghost story involves the desire for social advancement through marriage, jealousy, and a prank to scare away the competition.
"L'Envoy"	July 1820	English Edition, Volume 2	Crayon thanks his readers for their indulgence.

== Publishing history ==
=== American editions ===
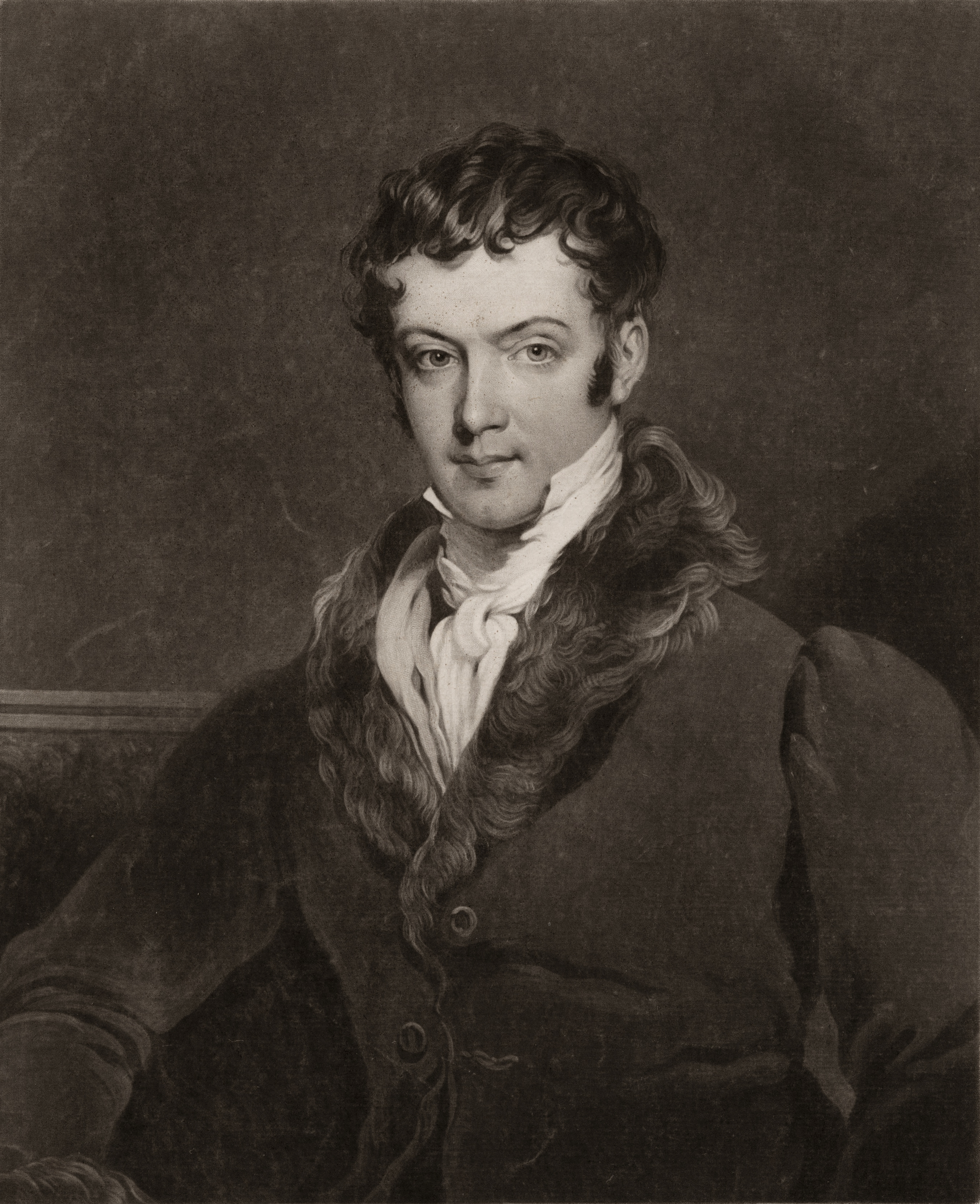
Washington Irving in 1820

The first American edition of The Sketch Book initially comprised twenty-nine short stories and essays, published in the United States in seven paperbound installments, appearing intermittently between June 23, 1819, and September 13, 1820. Irving used his brother Ebenezer and friend Henry Brevoort as his stateside emissaries, mailing packets of each installment to them for final editing and publication. Each installment was published simultaneously in New York, Boston, Baltimore, and Philadelphia by New York publisher C.S. Van Winkle, who would send each installment into a second printing through 1819 and 1820. Under Brevoort's influence, the books were formatted as large octavo editions printed on top-grade paper and utilizing 12-point typefaces instead of the usual 8-point type.

A single-volume hardcover version, reprinting the two English volumes, was published in the United States by Van Winkle in 1824.

==== Contents of the American installments ====
First installment (June 23, 1819)

- "The Author's Account of Himself"
- "The Voyage"
- "Roscoe"
- "The Wife"
- "Rip Van Winkle"

Second installment (July 31, 1819)

- "English Writers on America"
- "Rural Life in England"
- "The Broken Heart"
- "The Art of Book Making"

Third installment (September 13, 1819)

- "A Royal Poet"
- "The Country Church"
- "The Boar's Head Tavern, East Cheap"
- "The Widow and Her Son"

Fourth installment (November 10, 1819)

- "The Mutability of Literature"
- "Rural Funerals"
- "The Inn Kitchen"
- "The Spectre Bridegroom"

Fifth installment (January 1, 1820)

- "Christmas"
- "The Stage Coach"
- "Christmas Eve"
- "Christmas Day"
- "Christmas Dinner"

Sixth installment (March 15, 1820)

- "John Bull"
- "The Pride of the Village"
- "The Legend of Sleepy Hollow"

Seventh installment (September 13, 1820)

- "Little Britain"
- "Stratford-On-Avon"
- "Westminster Abbey"
- "The Angler"

=== English edition ===
Portions of The Sketch Book were almost immediately reprinted in British literary magazines – and with no real international copyright laws to protect American works from being reprinted in England, poached American writers were entitled neither to the profits for their work, nor to legal recourse. Irving was concerned about such literary piracy – "I am fearful some [British] Bookseller in the American trade may get hold of [The Sketch Book]," he told his brother in law, "and so run out an edition of it without my adapting it for the London public – or participating in the profits." Determined to protect The Sketch Book from further poaching, Irving arranged to secure his British copyright by self-publishing the work in London.

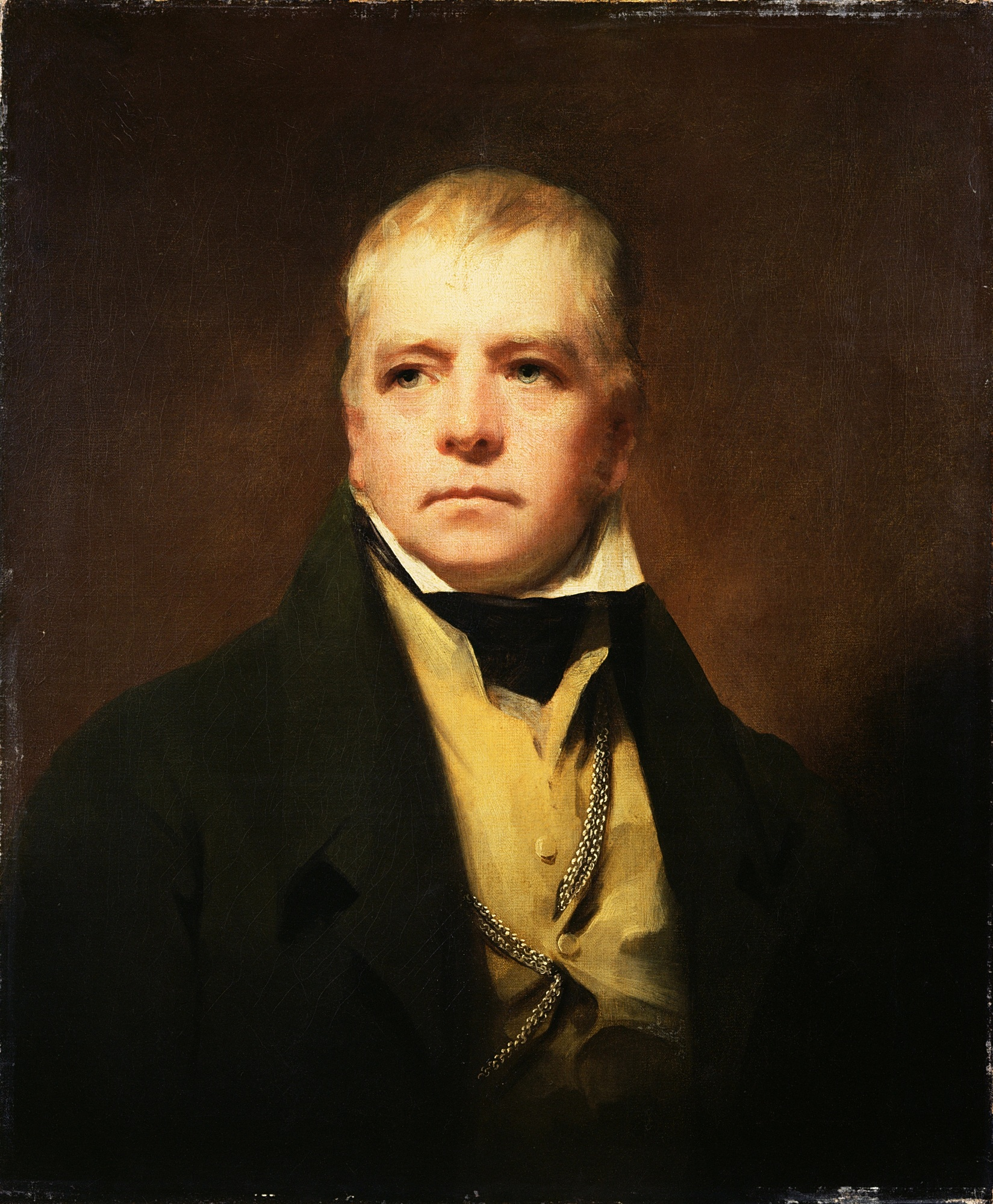
An early admirer of Irving and his work, Sir Walter Scott encouraged his own publisher, John Murray, to take up The Sketch Book.

The first four American installments were collected into a single volume and self-published by Irving in London, under John Miller's Burlington Arcade imprint, on February 16, 1820. In early April, however, Miller went bankrupt, leaving the bulk of The Sketch Book unsold in his warehouse.

Searching for another publisher, Irving appealed to his friend and mentor, Sir Walter Scott, for assistance. Scott approached his own publisher, London powerhouse John Murray, and convinced him to purchase the rest of the stock and continue publication. (In gratitude, Irving dedicated the English editions of The Sketch Book to Walter Scott.) Heartened by the enthusiastic response to The Sketch Book, Murray encouraged Irving to publish the remaining three American installments as a second volume as quickly as possible.

In July 1820, Murray published the second volume of The Sketch Book, including all the pieces from the final three American installments, plus three additional essays: the American Indian sketches "Philip of Pokanoket" and "Traits of Indian Character", which Irving had originally written for the Analectic Magazine in 1814, and a short original piece, "L'Envoy", in which Irving thanked his British readers for their indulgence.

Given Irving's additions, the English version of The Sketch Book contained thirty-two pieces, while its American counterpart contained only twenty-nine.

=== Author's revised edition ===
In 1848, as part of the Author's Revised Edition he was completing for publisher George Putnam, Irving added two new stories to The Sketch Book – "London Antiques" and "A Sunday in London" – as well as a new preface and the postscript to "Rip Van Winkle". Irving also slightly changed the order of the sketches, placing a number of essays from the seventh American installment earlier in the collection, and moving "The Legend of Sleepy Hollow" into a place of prominence as the final story in the collection ("L'Envoy" being merely a thank you to readers).

== Public and critical response ==
The first American reviews were the result of well-placed advance publicity, performed on Irving's behalf by his friend Henry Brevoort. Three days after the book's release, Brevoort placed an anonymous review in the New-York Evening Post, lauding The Sketch Book and making it clear to readers that it was Irving's work:

The graces of style; the rich, warm tone of benevolent feeling; the freely-flowing vein of hearty and happy humour, and the fine-eyed spirit of observation, sustained by an enlightened understanding and regulated by a perception of fitness – a tact – wonderfully quick and sure, for which Mr. Irving has been heretofore so much distinguished, are all exhibited anew in the Sketch Book, with freshened beauty and added charms.

Outside Irving's immediate circle of friends, the reviews were equally positive. As critic Gulian Verplanck wrote:

It will be needless to inform any who have read the book, that it is from the pen of Mr. Irving. His rich, and sometimes extravagant humour, his gay and graceful fancy ... betray the author in every page; even without the aid of those minor peculiarities of style, taste, and local allusions, which at once identify the travelled Geoffrey Crayon with the venerable Knickerbocker.

Two of the book's early admirers were Sir Walter Scott (who called it "positively beautiful") and Lord Byron (who said of the book, "I know it by heart"). Years later, poet Henry Wadsworth Longfellow said The Sketch Book was one of the earliest works to excite his interest in literature. As he said, "Every reader has his first book; I mean to say, one book among all others which in early youth first fascinates his imagination, and at once excites and satisfies the desires of his mind .... To me, this first book was The Sketch Book of Washington Irving". Writer and critic John Neal offered qualified criticism, praising the book but finding many faults. In American Writers (1824–25) he wrote: "The Sketch-Book—is a timid, beautiful work; with some childish pathos in it; some rich, pure, bold poetry; a little squeamish, puling, lady-like sentimentality: some courageous writing—some wit—and a world of humor".

Apart from "Rip Van Winkle" and "The Legend of Sleepy Hollow", both of which were immediately acknowledged as The Sketch Book's finest pieces, American and English readers alike responded most strongly to the more sentimental tales, especially "The Broken Heart", – which Byron claimed had made him weep – and "The Widow and Her Son".

In Britain, the book did much to promote Americans as legitimate writers, and their work as legitimate literature – a concept that surprised English critics. "Everywhere I find in it the marks of a mind of the utmost elegance and refinement," wrote the English historian William Godwin, "a thing as you know that I was not exactly prepared to look for in an American." The English magazine Quarterly Review agreed. "[Irving] seems to have studied our language where alone it can be studied in all its strength and perfection, and in working these precious mines of literature he has refined for himself the ore which there so richly abounds."

Even Irving admitted that he was pleased to have stunned the skeptical English critics. When one English admirer asked Irving to confirm that he was really an American, Irving responded enthusiastically: "The doubts which her ladyship has heard on the subject seem to have arisen from the old notion that it is impossible for an American to write decent English."

The book is compared favourably with William Pinnock's English educational texts in George Eliot's novel The Mill on the Floss (1860): Maggie, talking about her 'gloomy fancy' to her cousin Lucy says:

"Perhaps it comes from the school diet – watery rice-pudding spiced with Pinnock. Let us hope it will give way before my mother's custards and this charming Geoffrey Crayon." Maggie took up the Sketch Book, which lay by her on the table. (Book 6, Chapter 2)

The Sketch Book cemented Irving's reputation, and propelled him to a level of celebrity previously unseen for an American writer. "I am astonished at the success of my writings in England," Irving wrote to his publisher, "and can hardly persuade myself that it is not all a dream. Had any one told me a few years since in America, that any thing I could write would interest such men as . . . Byron, I should have as readily believed a fairy tale."

== Influence on American culture ==
The Sketch Book introduced three of Irving's most enduring and iconic characters, Rip Van Winkle, Ichabod Crane, and the Headless Horseman.

One of the most significant influences of The Sketch Book came from its cycle of five Christmas stories, portraying an idealized and old-fashioned Yule celebration at an English country manor. Irving's stories depicted harmonious warm-hearted English Christmas customs he observed while staying in Aston Hall, Birmingham, England, that had largely been abandoned, and he used the tract Vindication of Christmas (London 1652) of Old English Christmas traditions, that he had transcribed into his journal as a format for his stories. Except Pennsylvania German Settlers, who were enthusiastic celebrators of Christmas, Irving contributed to a revival of customs in the United States. Charles Dickens later credited Irving as an influence on his own Christmas writings, including the classic A Christmas Carol.

The U.S. Postal Service issued a Legend of Sleepy Hollow postage stamp for use with the 1974 Halloween mail.

Cultural depictions of The Sketch Book of Geoffrey Crayon, Gent.
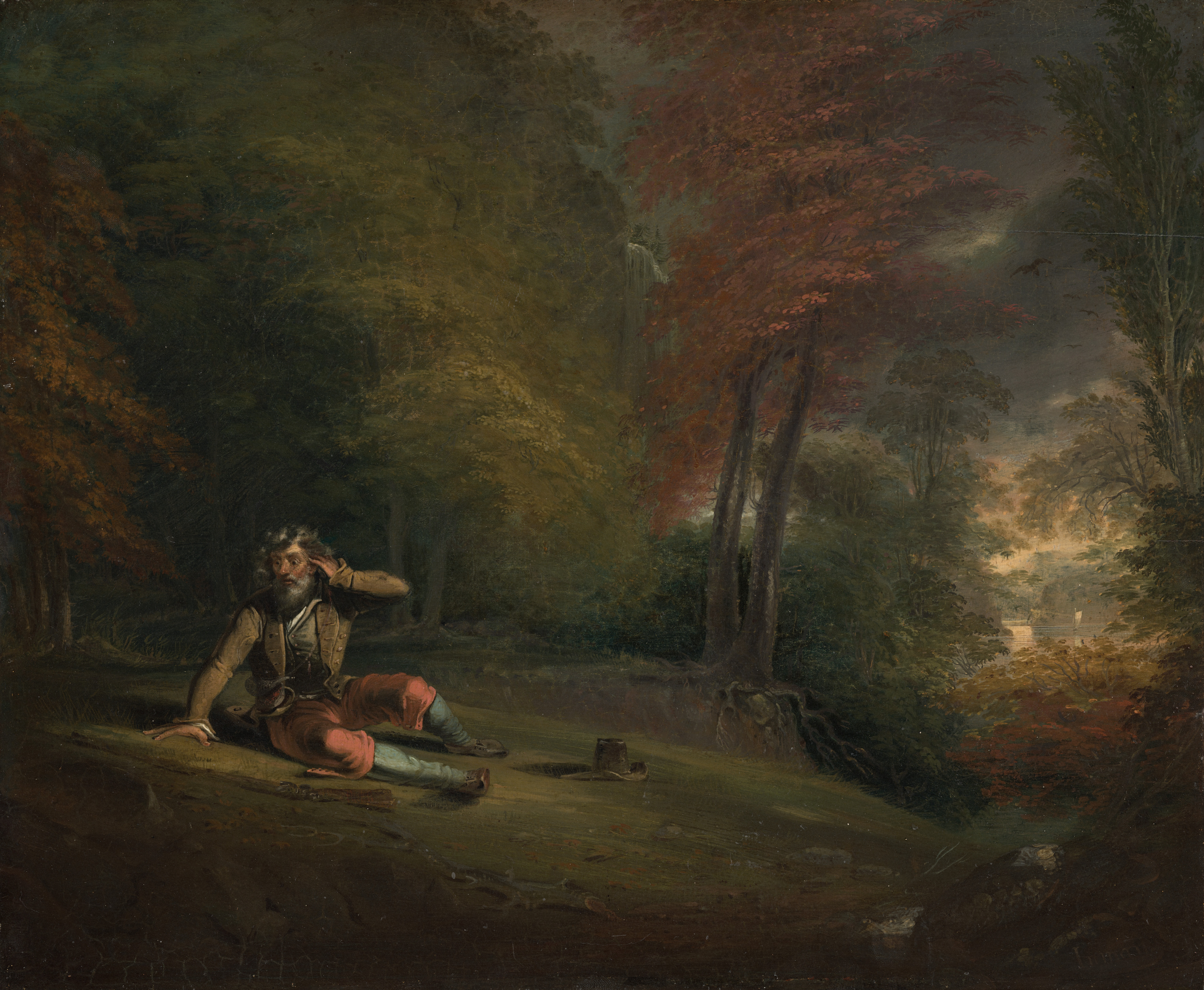
Rip Van Winkle Awakening from His Long Sleep by Henry Inman, 1823

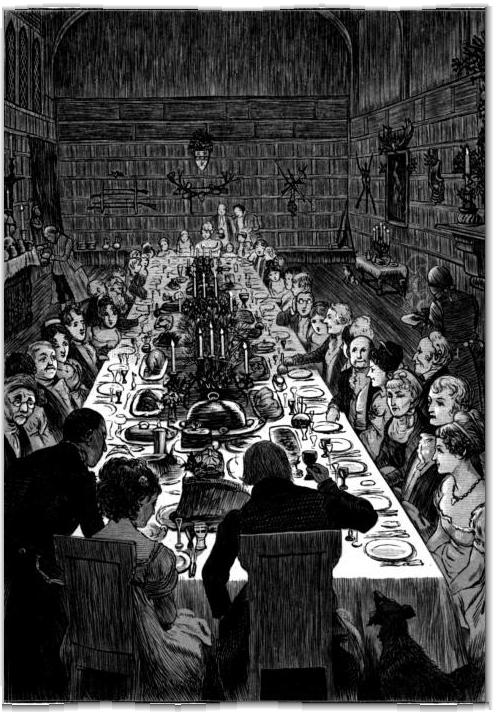
"The Christmas Dinner" illustrated by Randolph Caldecott (1876)

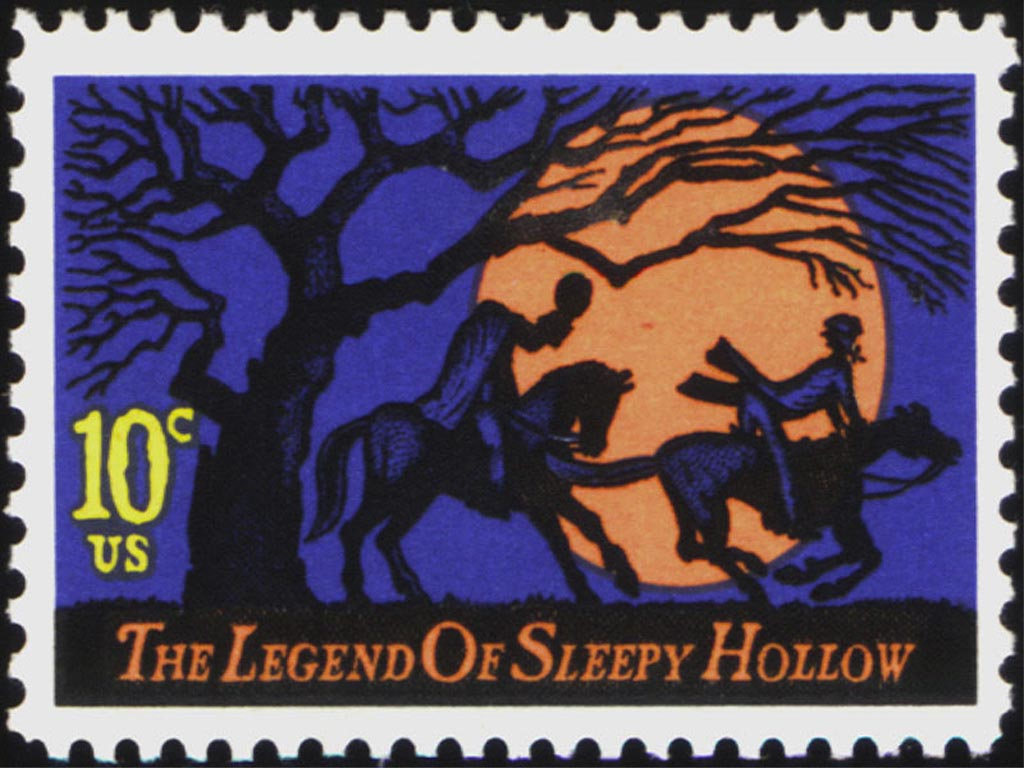
Legend of Sleepy Hollow U.S. postage stamp issued October 12, 1974, depicting the Headless Horseman and Ichabod Crane.

== Bibliography ==
- Burstein, Andrew (2007). The Original Knickerbocker: The Life of Washington Irving. New York: Basic Books. ISBN 978-0-465-00853-7.
- Irving, Pierre (1862). The Life and Letters of Washington Irving. New York: G. P. Putnam.(4 vols. Cited herein as PMI.)
- Irving, Washington (1978). Springer, Haskell (ed.). "The Sketch Book of Geoffrey Crayon, Gent". The Complete Works of Washington Irving. Vol. 8. Boston: Twayne.
- Jones, Brian Jay (2008). Washington Irving: An American Original. New York: Arcade. ISBN 978-1-55970-836-4.
