= Henry Inman (painter) =

American painter (1801–1846)

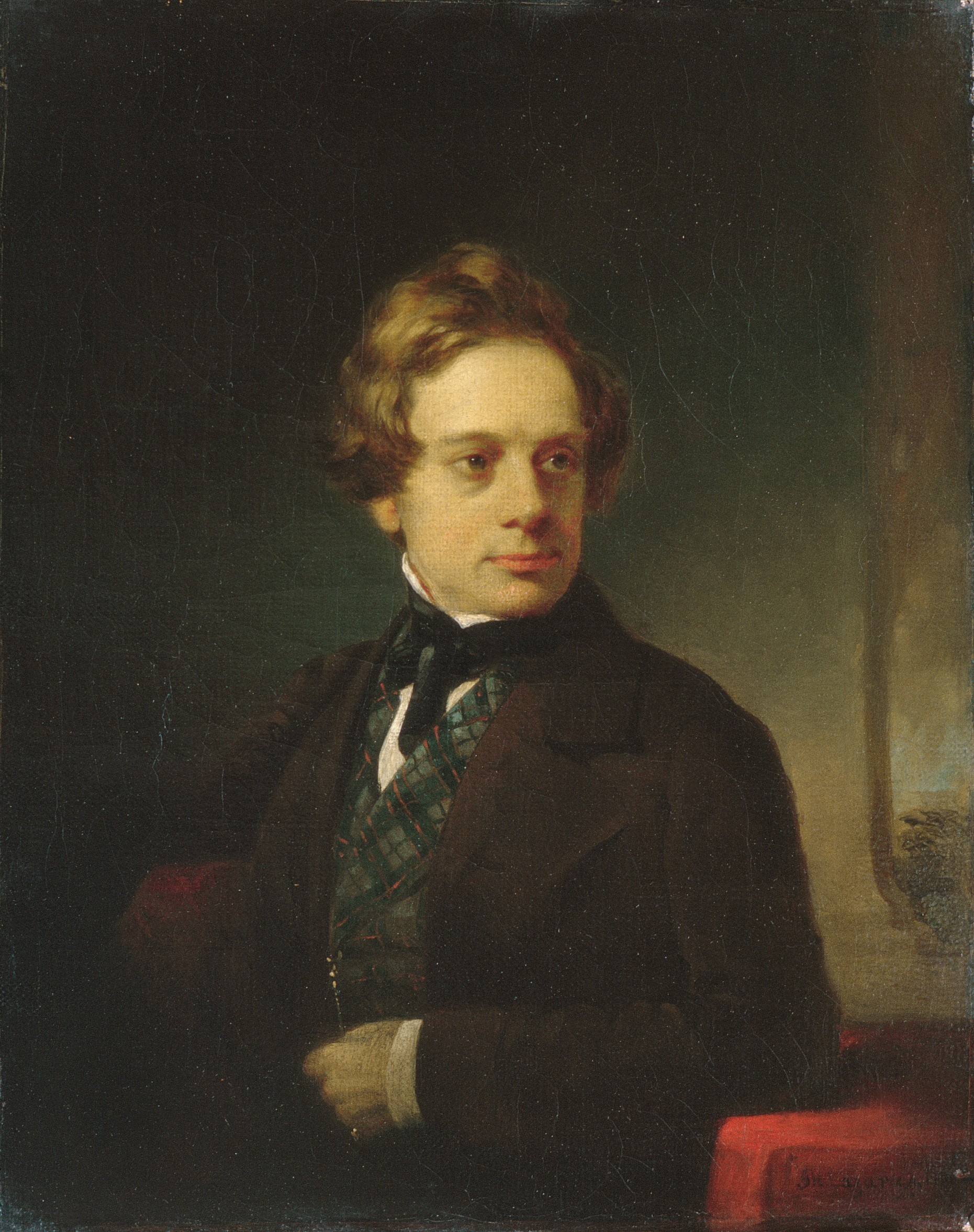
- Painting of Inman by Jacob Hart Lazarus, circa 1837–1840, Metropolitan Museum of Art
- Born: October 20, 1801; Utica, New York, U.S.
- Died: January 17, 1846 (aged 44); Manhattan, New York, U.S.
- Spouse: Jane Riker O'Brien (m. 1822)
- Children: John O'Brien Inman; Henry Inman, Jr.

Henry Inman (October 20, 1801 – January 17, 1846) was an American portrait, genre, and landscape painter.

== Early life ==
He was born at Utica, New York, to English immigrant parents who were among the first settlers of Utica. His family moved to New York City in 1812.

Beginning in 1814 and continuing for the next seven years, he was an apprentice pupil of John Wesley Jarvis in New York City, along with John Quidor.

== Career ==
He was the first vice president of the National Academy of Design, where he a great number of his paintings were exhibited. He excelled in portrait painting, but was less careful in genre pictures. Among his landscapes are Rydal Falls, England, October Afternoon, and Ruins of Brambletye. His genre subjects include Rip Van Winkle, The News Boy, and Boyhood of Washington. His portraits include those of Henry Rutgers and Fitz-Greene Halleck in the New York Historical Society. He also painted portraits of Angelica Singleton Van Buren, Bishop White, Chief Justices Marshall and Nelson, Jacob Barker, William Wirt, Audubon, DeWitt Clinton, Richard Varick, Martin Van Buren, Francis L. Hawks, and William H. Seward.

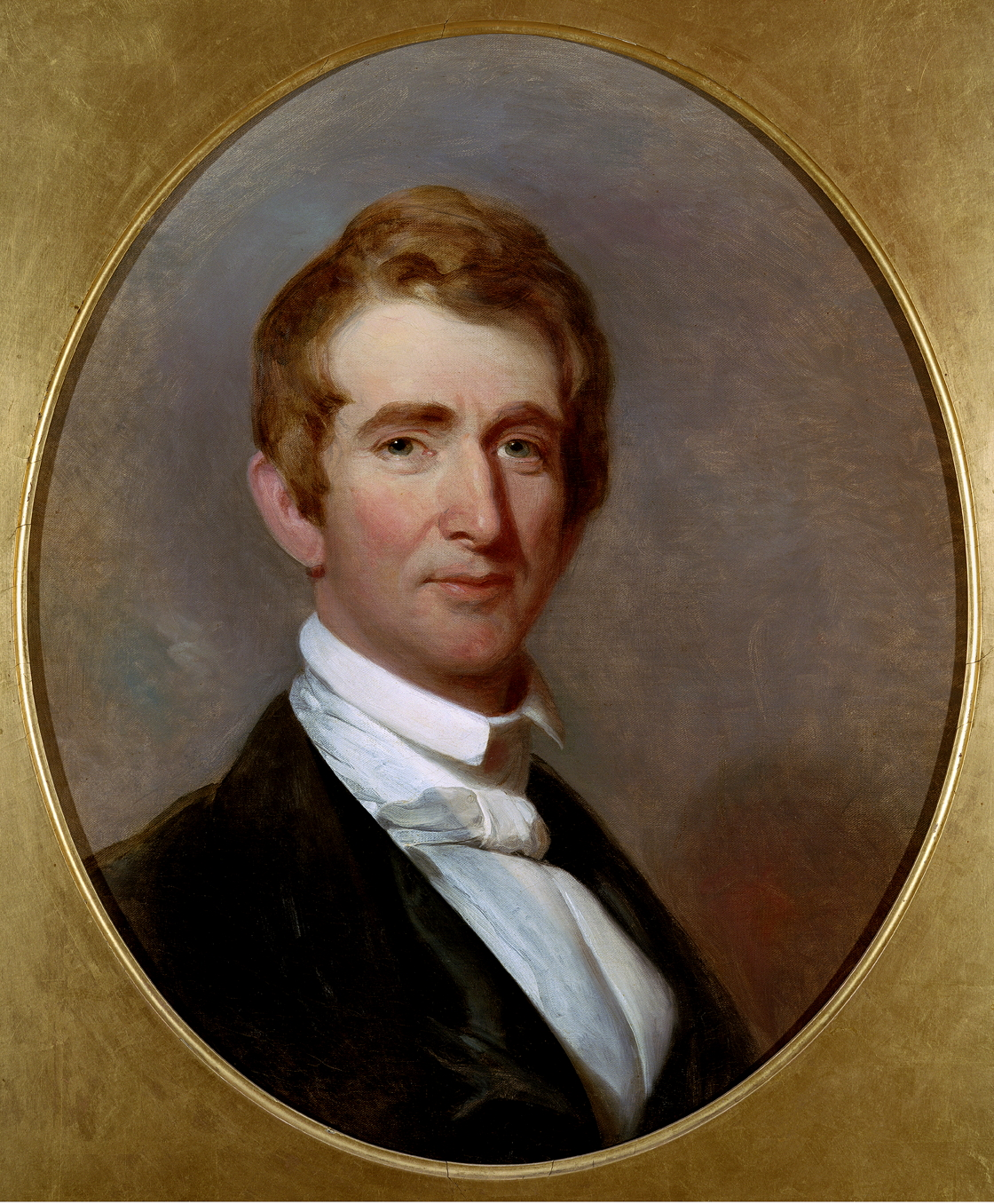
William Henry Seward around 1844

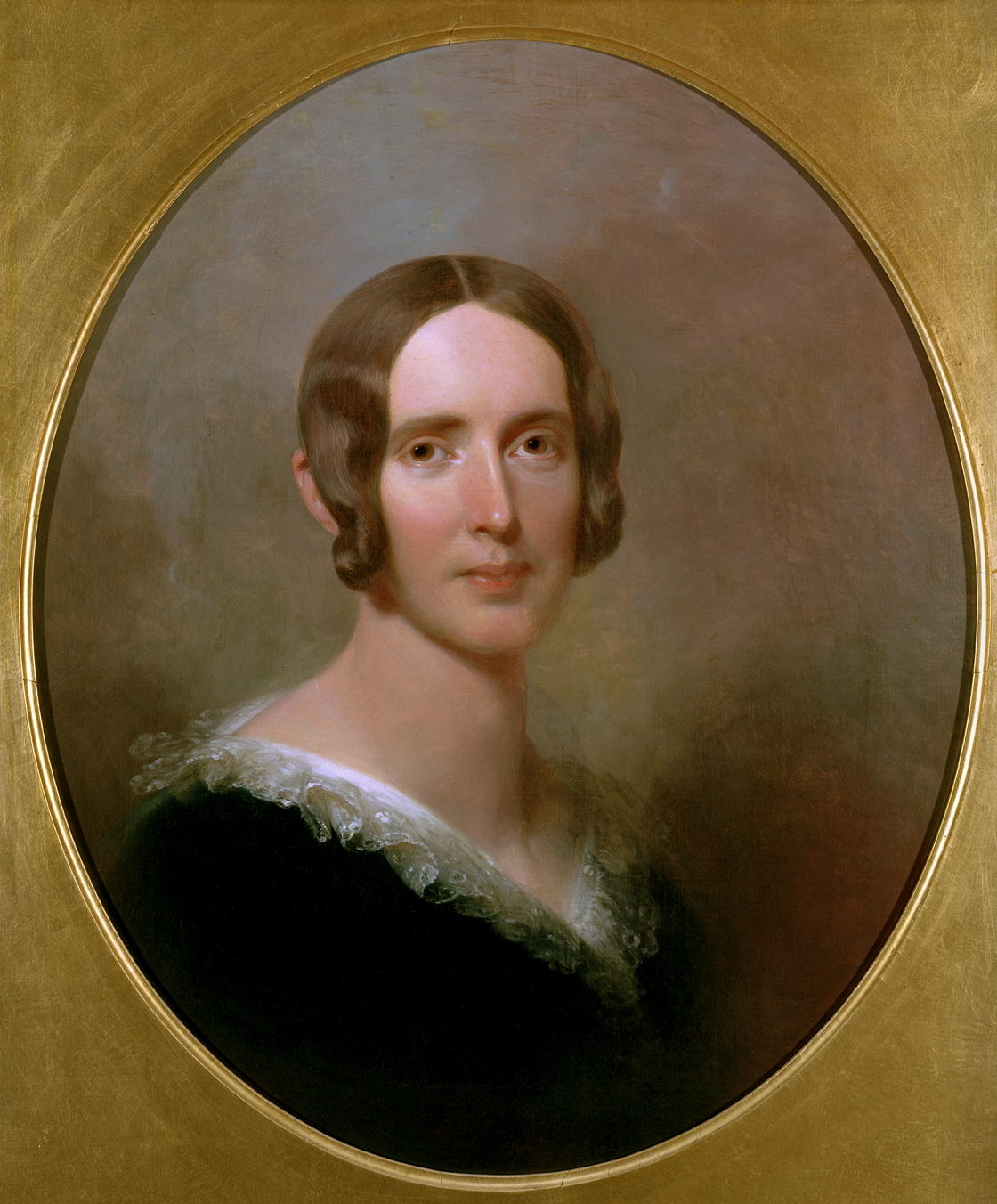
Seward's wife Frances Adeline Seward

Thomas L. McKenney assigned Inman, who was an accomplished lithographer, the task of copying more than a hundred oil paintings of Native American leaders by Charles Bird King to translate into a printed book, the History of the Indian Tribes of North America. The oil paintings are now in the collections of White House, the Joslyn Art Museum, Harvard Art Museums, and the Amon Carter Museum of American Art, among others. Inman also painted illustrations for The Sketch Book by Washington Irving and The Last of the Mohicans by James Fenimore Cooper. Many more appeared as engravings in The Atlantic Souvenir and The Token annual gift books in the late 1820s and early 1830s. In the Metropolitan Museum, New York, are his Martin Van Buren, The Young Fisherman, and William C. Maccready as William Tell, the last of which considered his most famous. Critic John Neal in The Yankee called it "a remarkably fine picture, notwithstanding its faults ... a bold, impassioned, well-painted picture".

During a year spent in England in 1844–1845, he painted Wordsworth, Macaulay, John Chambers, Sir William Stewart, Baronet of Blair and other celebrities.

At the time of his death, he was engaged on a series of historical pictures for the Capitol at Washington. He was also president of National Academy of Design.

Among his pupils was the portraitist and still-life painter Thomas Wightman.

== Personal life ==
In 1822, Inman was married to Jane Riker O'Brien (1796–1873). Together, they were the parents of:

- Mary Lawrence Inman (1826–1860), who married Smith Cutter Coddington (1812–1868) in 1844.
- John O'Brien Inman (1828–1896), who was also a painter.
- Mary Lucy Inman (1828–1907), who married William Vail (1815–1880)
- Henry Inman, Jr. (1837–1899), a writer who married Eunice Churchill Dyer (1842–1922) in 1862.

Inman died on January 17, 1846, after returning from England to America due to failing health.

== Selected works ==
Paintings by Henry Inman

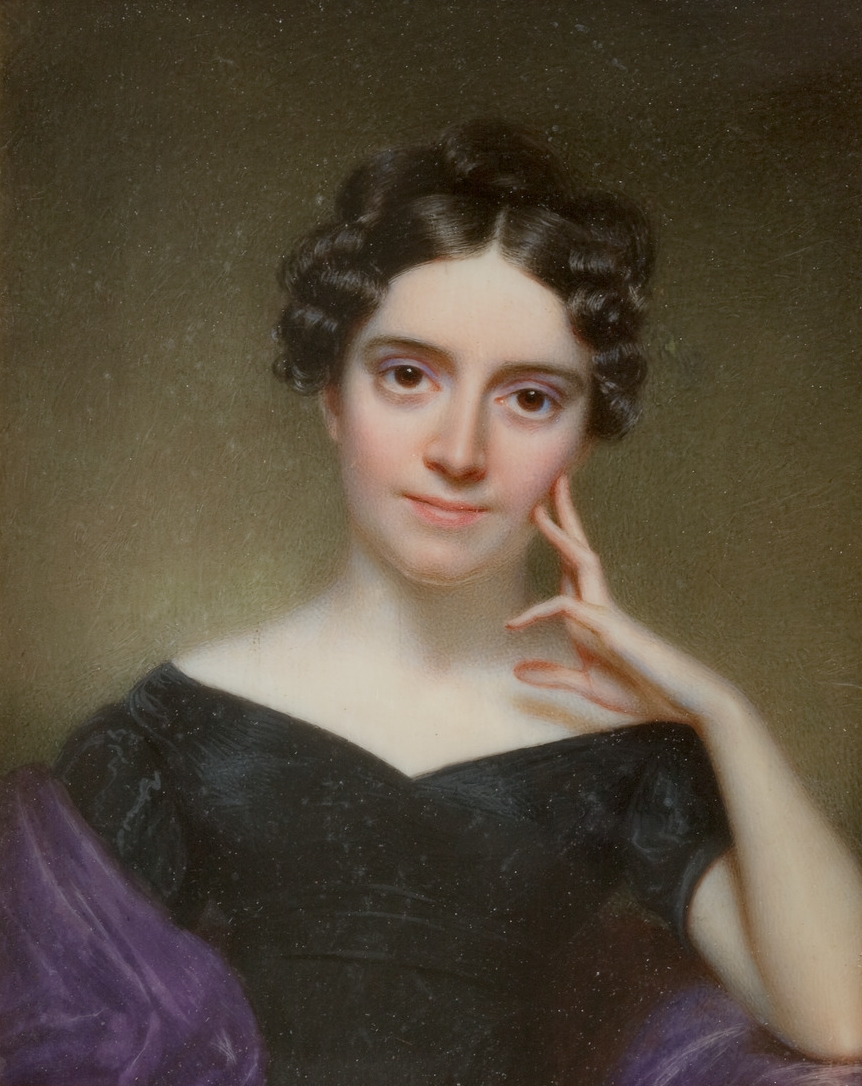
Portrait of Mrs. William Samuel Johnson (1823), Yale University Art Gallery

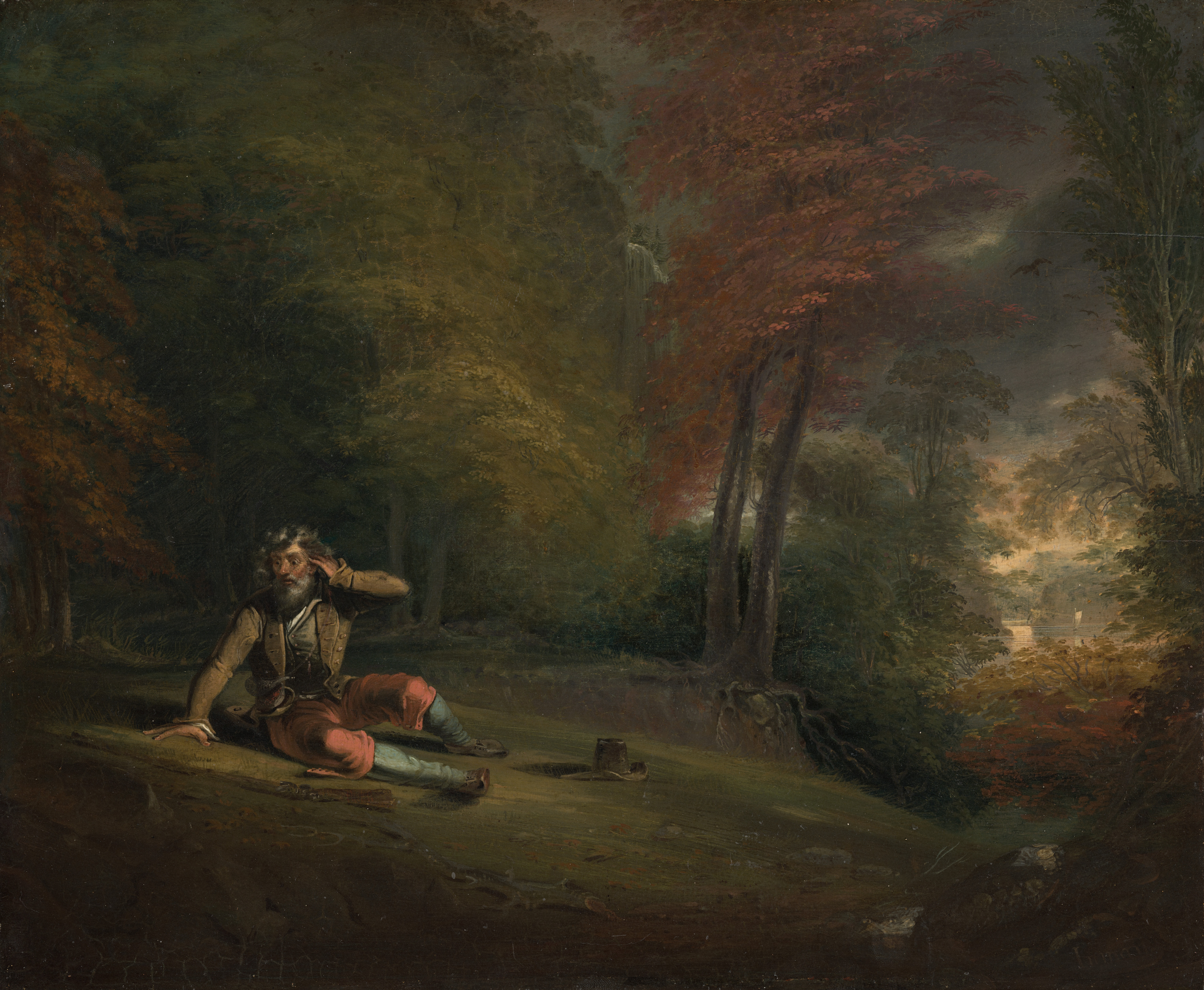
Rip Van Winkle Awakening from His Long Sleep (1823), National Gallery of Art

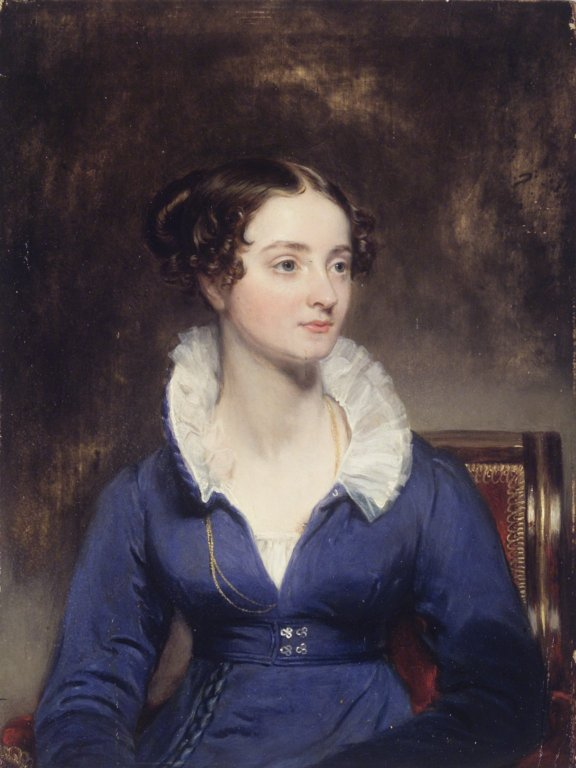
Portrait of a Woman (1825), Brooklyn Museum

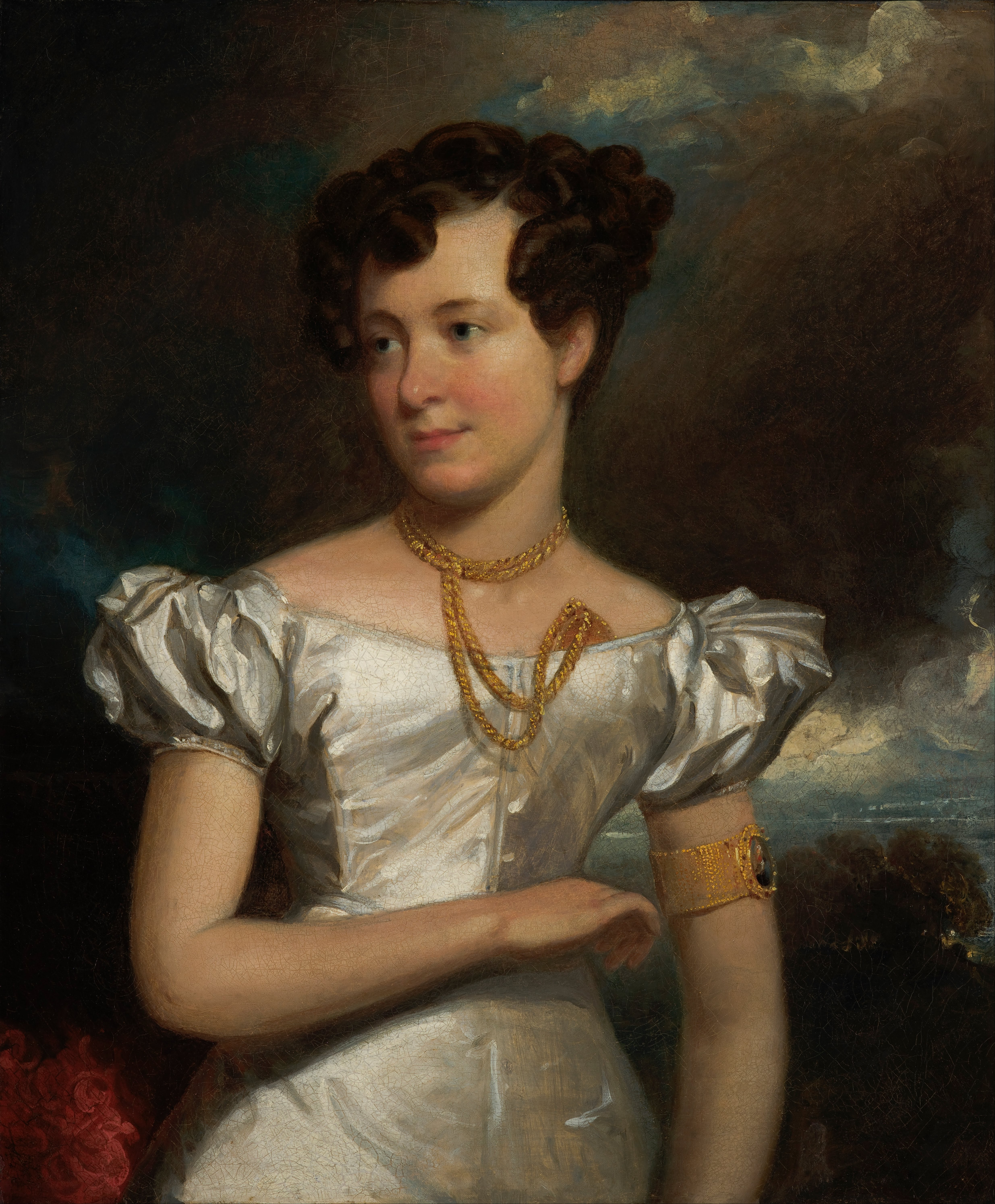
Portrait of Clara Fisher (1828), Indianapolis Museum of Art

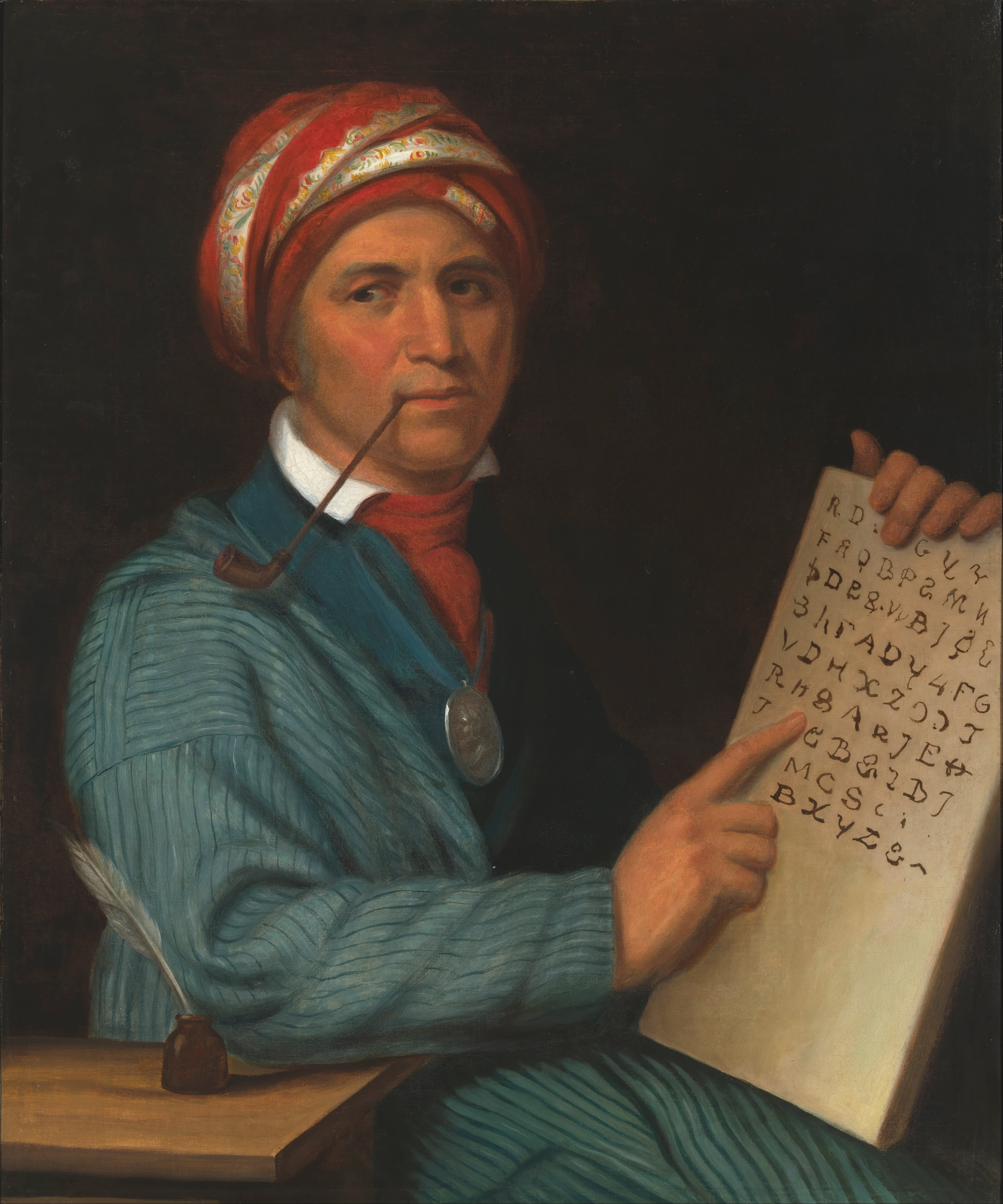
Portrait of Sequoyah (c. 1830), National Portrait Gallery (United States)

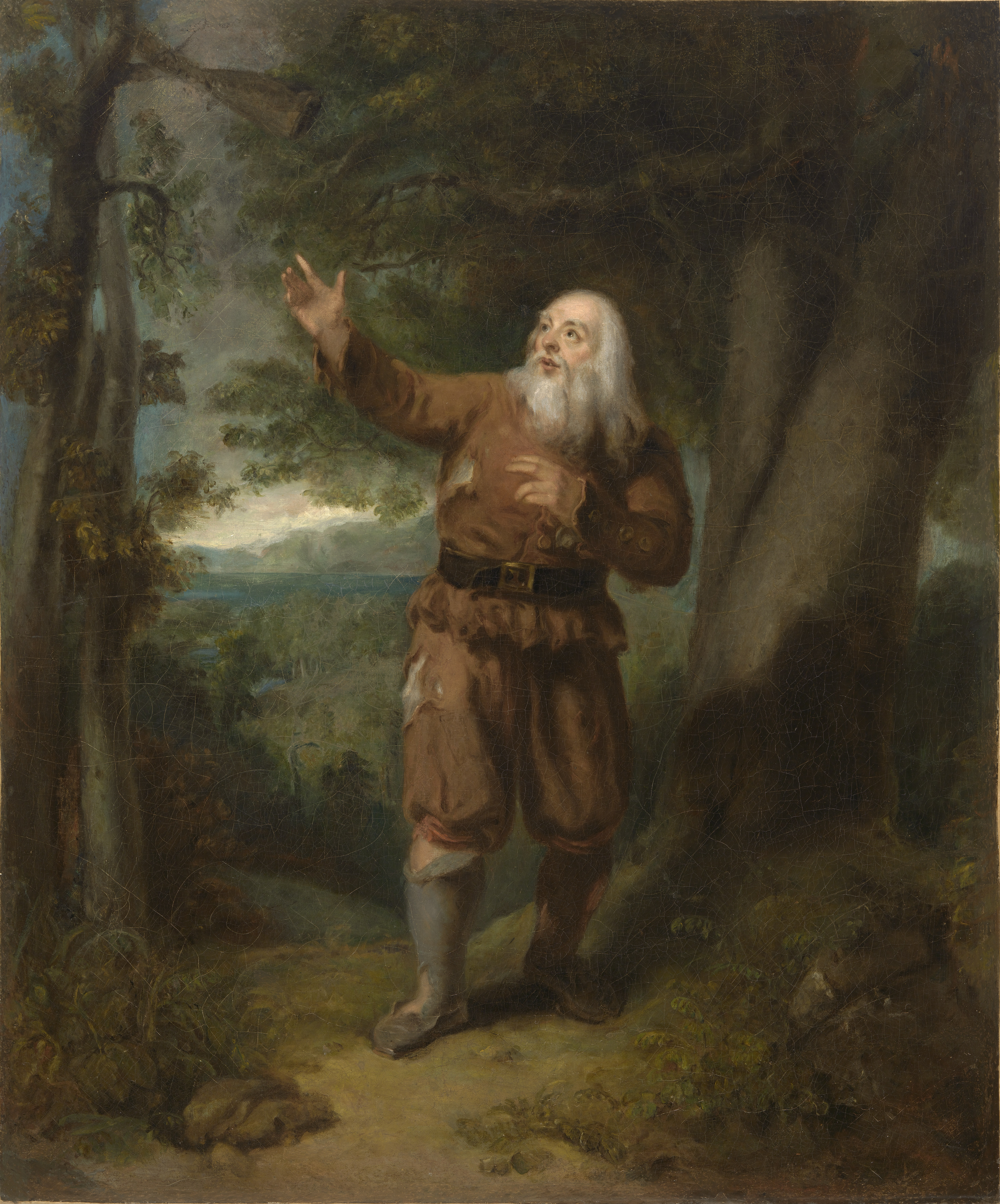
James Henry Hackett in the Character of Rip Van Winkle (1832), National Portrait Gallery

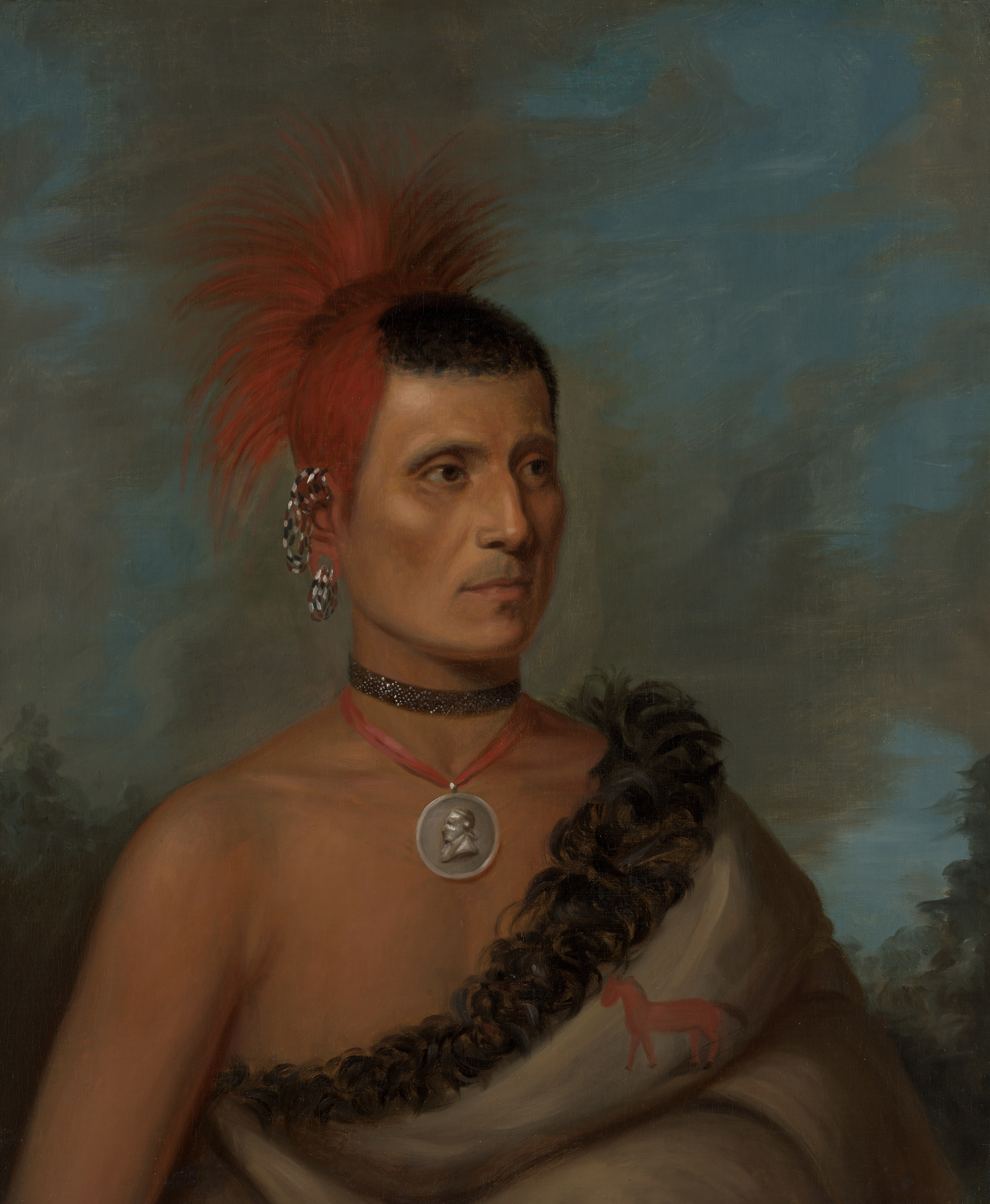
Pes-Ke-Le-Cha-Co (1832–1833), Metropolitan Museum of Art

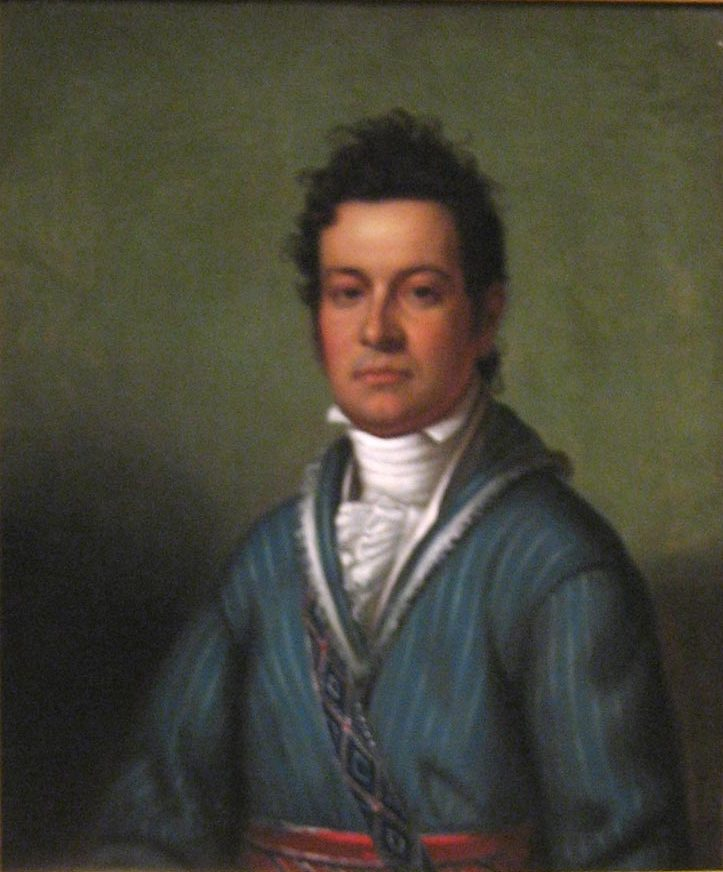
Portrait of David Vanon (1832–33)

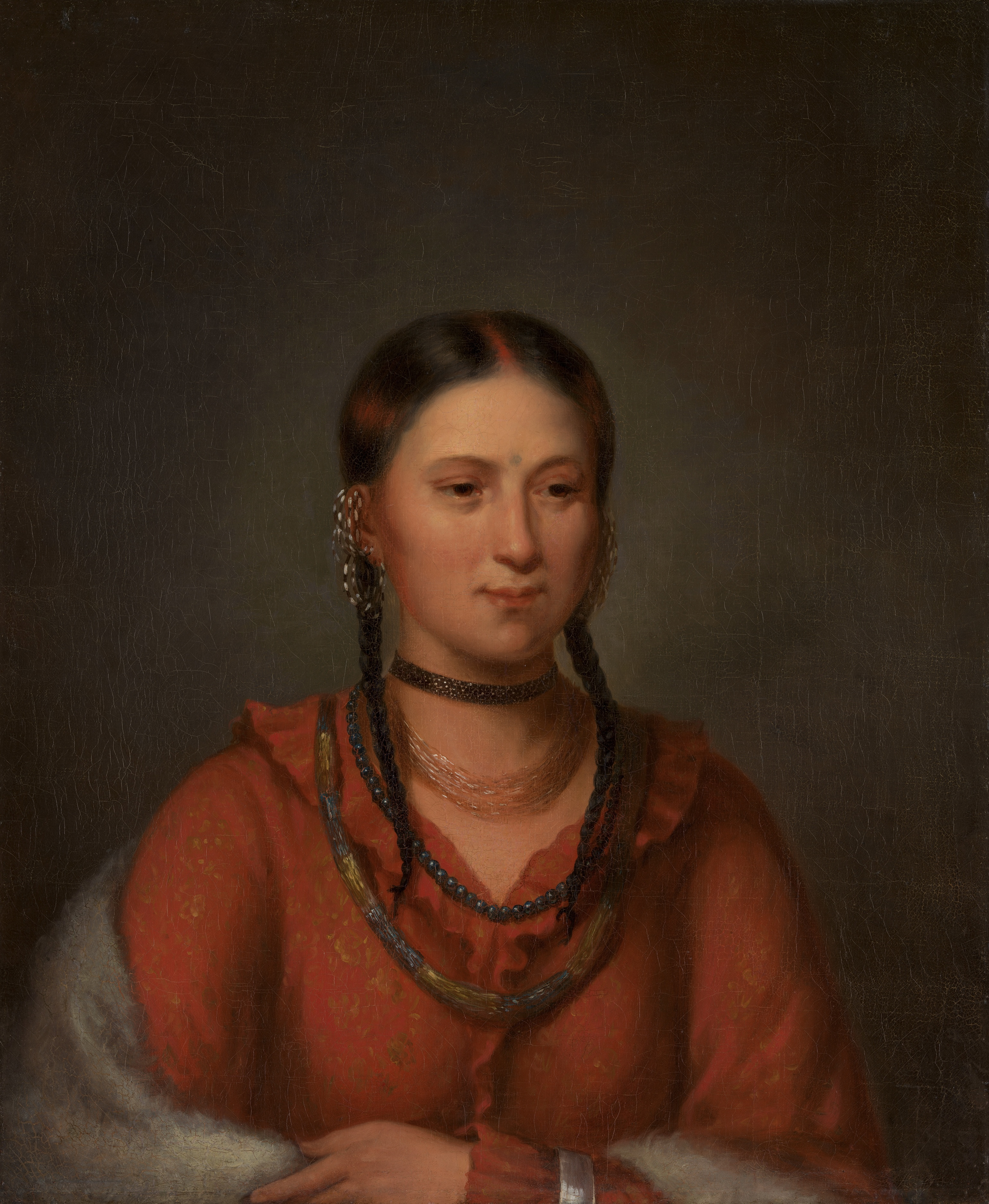
Portrait of the Eagle of Delight (1832–1833), Metropolitan Museum of Art

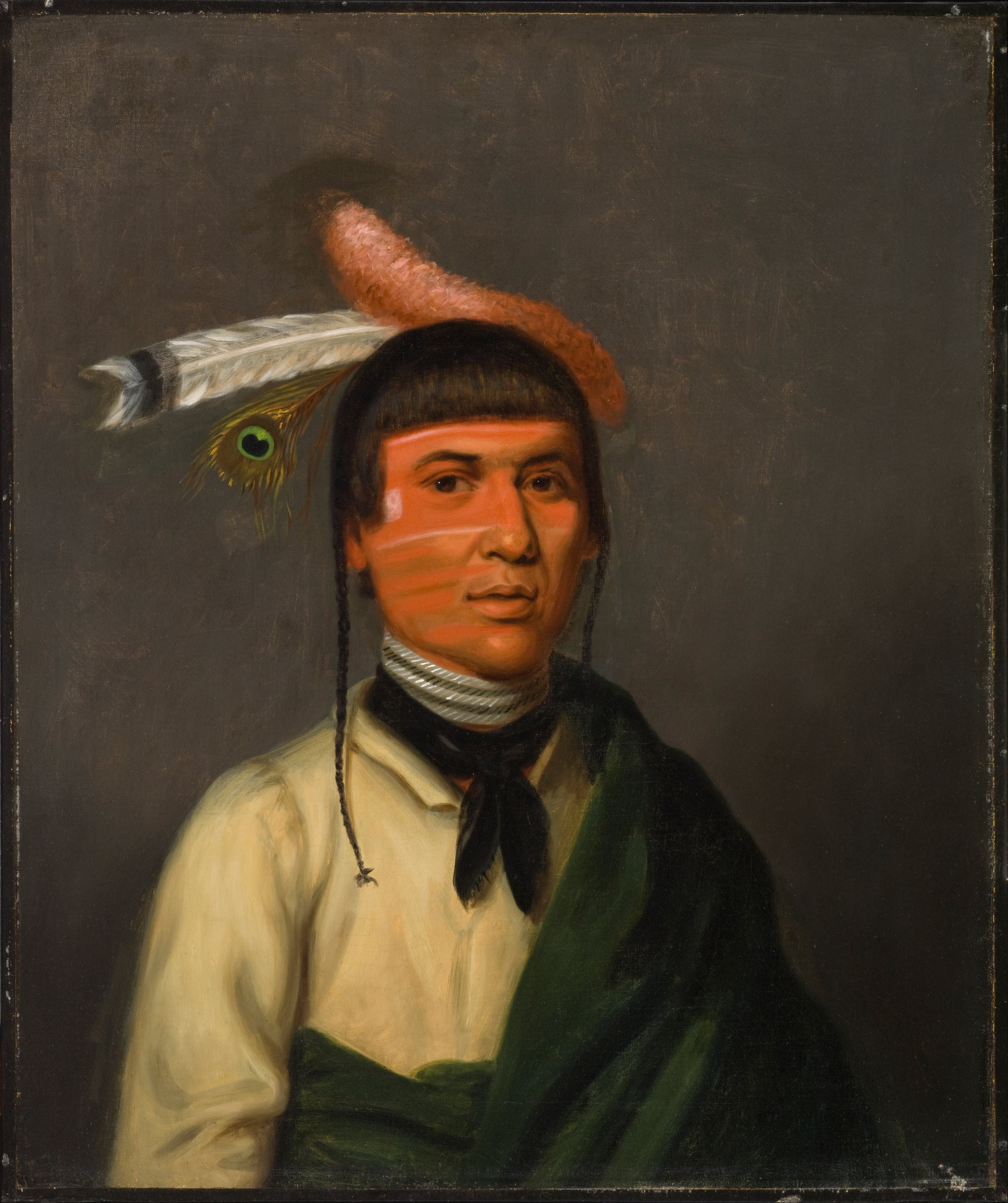
Portrait of No-Tin (Wind) (1832–33), Los Angeles County Museum of Art

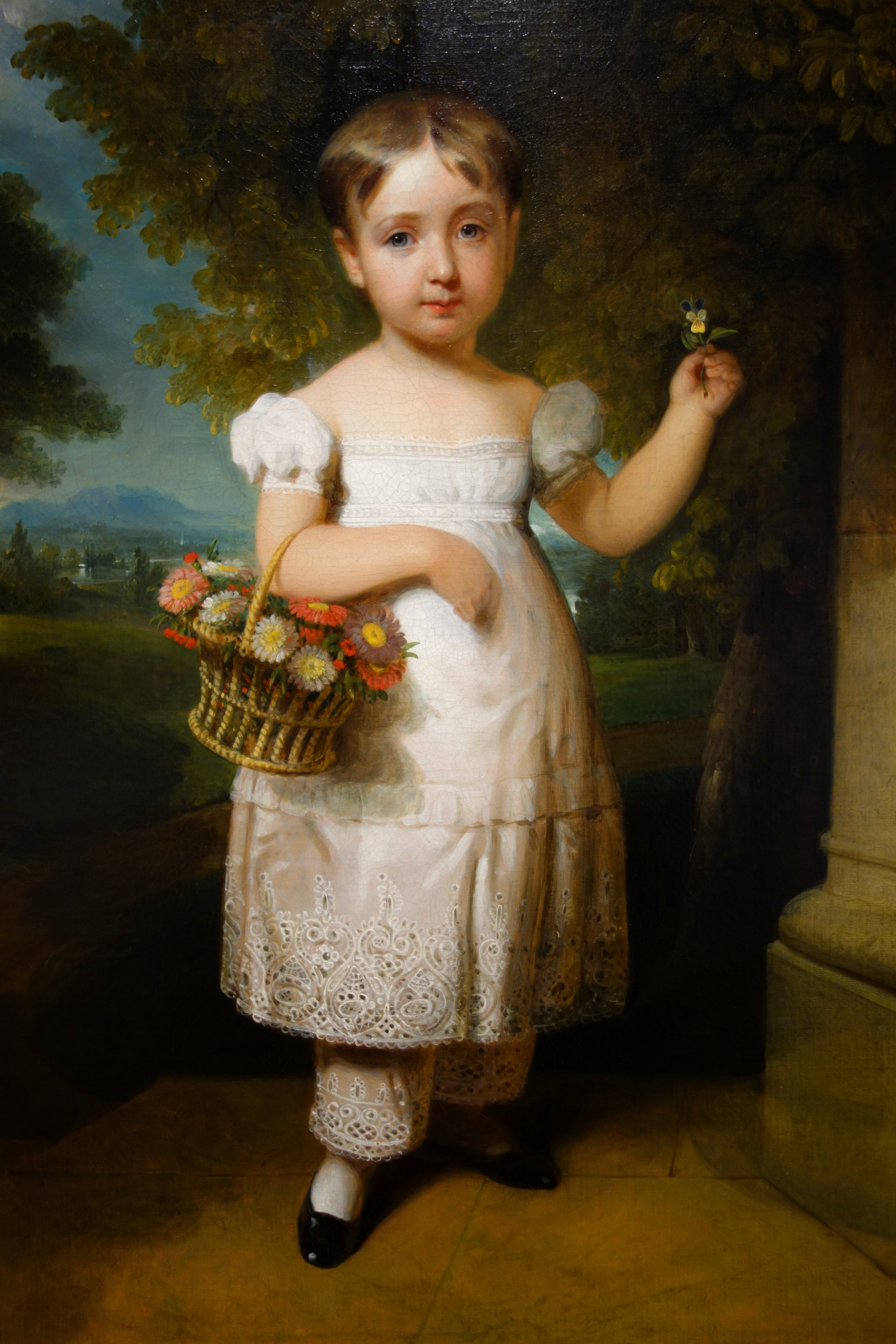
Portrait of Cornelia Rutgers Livingston (1833), New Britain Museum of American Art

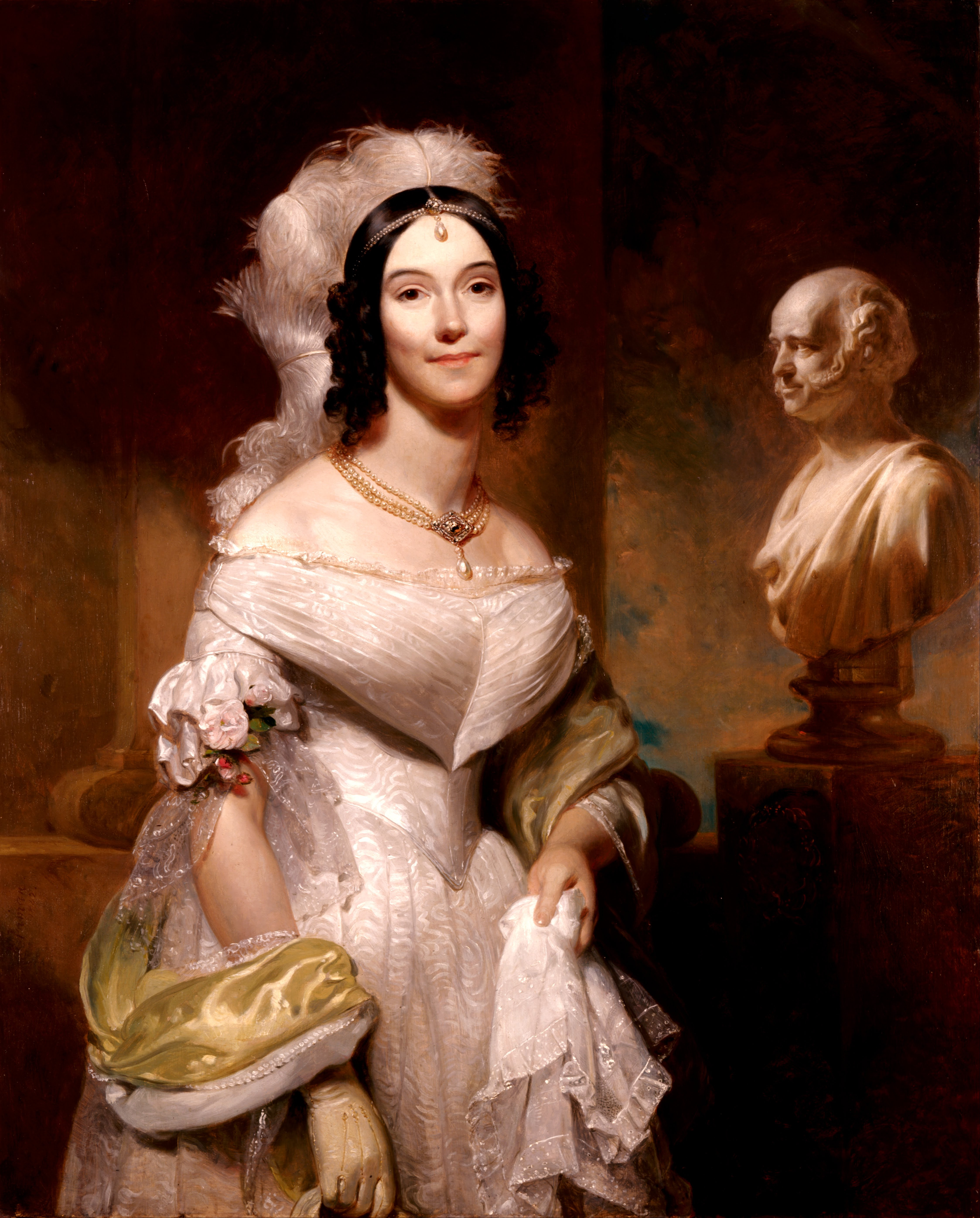
Portrait of Angelica Singleton Van Buren (c. 1842), White House Collection

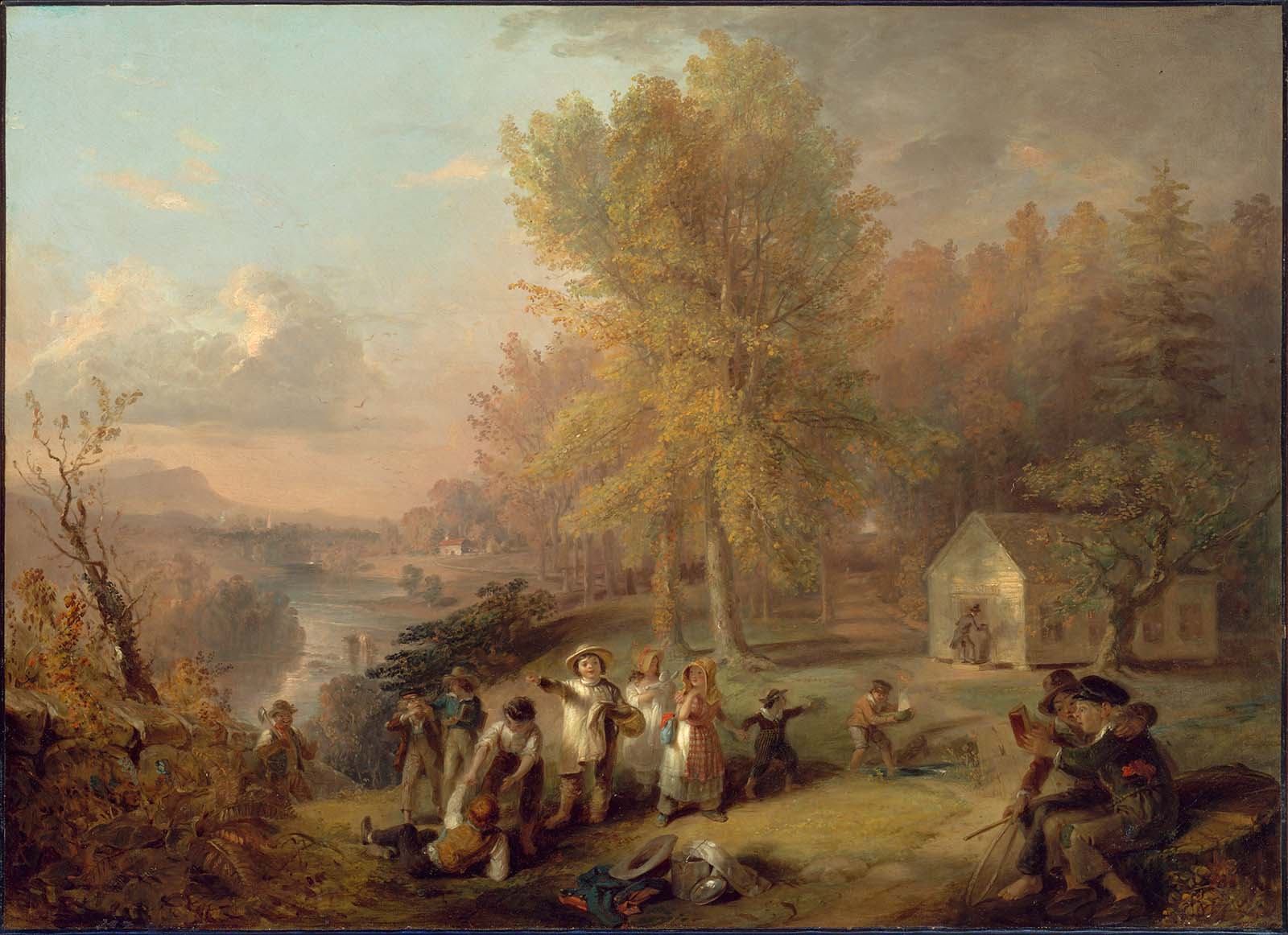
Dismissal of School on an October Afternoon (1845), Museum of Fine Arts, Boston
