= Rip Van Winkle Awakening from His Long Sleep =

Painting by Henry Inman

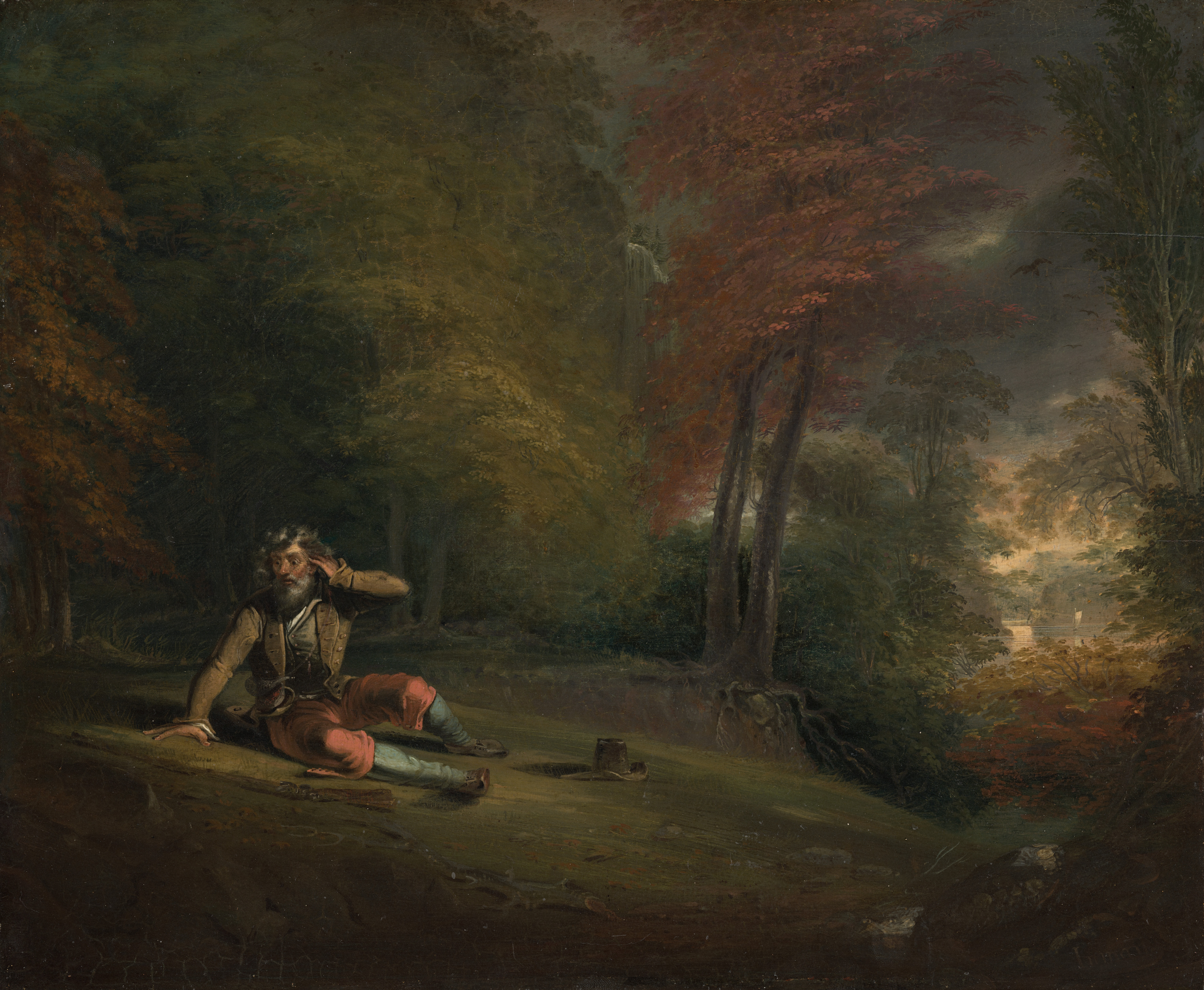
- Artist: Henry Inman
- Year: 1823
- Type: Oil on panel, genre painting
- Dimensions: 38.1 cm × 45.7 cm (15.0 in × 18.0 in)
- Location: National Gallery of Art, Washington D.C.

Rip Van Winkle Awakening from His Long Sleep is an 1823 oil painting by the American artist Henry Inman. It depicts a scene from the story of Rip Van Winkle, a lazy Dutch-American villager who goes to sleep for twenty years. It shows the moment Van Winkle, who had fallen into his lengthy sleep during the Colonial Period awakens to find himself in the Federalist Era of the now independent United States. Irving had included the story in his 1819 The Sketch Book of Geoffrey Crayon, written while he was living in London.

The painting was displayed at the 1823 exhibition of the American Academy of the Fine Arts in New York City. Long in a private collection, in 2018 if was gifted to the National Gallery of Art in Washington D.C.. In 1832 Inman produced another painting James Henry Hackett in the Character of Rip Van Winkle depicting the celebrated actor in the role which is now in the National Portrait Gallery of the Smithsonian.

== Bibliography ==
- Barratt, Carrie Rebora & Gerdts, William H. The Art of Henry Inman. Smithsonian Institution, 1987.
- Barratt, Carrie Rebora & Weinberg, Helene Barbara. American Stories: Paintings of Everyday Life, 1765-1915. Metropolitan Museum of Art, 2009.
- Orcutt, Kimberley A. The American Art-Union: Utopia and Skepticism in the Antebellum Era. Fordham University Press, 2004.
