= The Wife from the Dragon Palace =

Japanese folktale

The Wife from the Dragon Palace is a Japanese folktale collected by scholar Yanagita Kunio. A man of low social standing marries a maiden who is the daughter of a marine deity. After they return to land, a local man of higher social standing begins to desire the supernatural maiden, and devises ways to have her for himself by setting impossible tasks for the husband.

Scholars locate similar stories in Central and East Asia.

== Summary ==
Yanagita collected a variant from Kikaijima, Kagoshima. In this version, a woman lives with her only surviving son. He earns his living by gathering and selling flowers. One day, when he has not earned much, he throws a bunch of them into the sea as an offering to the Dragon God. A tortoise appears to him and leads him to the Dragon God's underwater palace. The tortoise also advises that, if the Dragon God offers him a gift, the boy should ask for his daughter. The boy spends three days in the underwater palace and returns to land with the Dragon King's daughter as his wife. When he goes back home, he learns that three years have passed and that his mother has died. Fortunately for him, his wife takes out a Life Whip and uses it on her mother-in-law to revive her. She also uses a magic mallet to create a larger house for them.

Some time later, a local feudal lord finds out about the flower-seller's beautiful wife and decides to have her for himself. First, he demands the flower-seller bring him 100 koku of rice. The boy returns home and tells his wife about the task. The Dragon God's daughter goes to the seashore and summons hundreds of horses that come out of the sea with the rice. Next, the feudal lord demands 1000 fathoms of rope to be delivered to him. Once again, the Dragon God's daughter produces the requested item after going to the sea shore. Thirdly, he announces he will visit the flower-seller's house with 699 men and demands his guests be fed and given 77 jars of foaming wine. The flower-seller's wife prepares the large banquet with trays of food and wine. Finally, the lord asks the girl to give them some rowdy entertainment. The Dragon God's daughter opens up a box; hundreds of men come out and perform a song and dance for the guests. The lord then asks for some quiet entertainment, and she opens another box: hundreds of men leap out of it with swords and kill the lord and his guests.

== Analysis ==
=== Tale type ===
The tale is classified in the international Aarne-Thompson-Uther Index as type ATU 465, "The Man persecuted because of his beautiful wife": a man of poor social standing marries or is given a beautiful wife of supernatural origin; some time later, an emperor, lord or nobleman of superior rank lusts after the wife of supernatural origin and sends the mortal husband on impossible quests.

Japanese folklorist Seki Keigo indexed in his own system of Japanese folktales a tale type he termed The Wife from the Ryūgū (Dragon Palace). In this type, a poor flower-dealer gives an offering to the king of the Ryugu (Dragon Palace). A messenger from the underwater palace comes and takes the flower-dealer to the king's presence. The king is pleased by the man's offering, gives him a gift and allows him to marry his daughter. Back on land, a local feudal lord imposes difficult tasks on the man, otherwise he must forfeit his wife, the underwater king's daughter.

=== Motifs ===
According to scholarship, in type 465, the hero saves the child of the underwater king and is invited to go down there. Usually, the hero meets the underwater king (who is a dragon king) and marries his daughter, but in some variants he can marry the daughter of the Chinese emperor. In most of the variants from East, Southeast and Central Asia, the underwater king's daughter appears as a fish or a dragon, less commonly as a bird or a dog.

== Variants ==
According to Sinologist Boris L. Riftin, the tale is very popular among East Asian and Central Asian peoples: a human rescues a son or daughter of the king of dragons or snakes, visits the underwater realm and is rewarded with a box with the dragon king's daughter inside, whom he marries.

=== Literary predecessors ===
The oldest attestation of the tale type is found in ancient East Asian literature of the 7th century, namely Chinese and Japanese. Seki Keigo pinned down its appearance in some literary collections of his country, such as in Nihongi, the Ryoi-ki and the Sangoku Denki.

=== Japan ===
Yanagita located variants from across Japan in the following regions: Iwate; Niigata; Gifu, Yoshiki-gun; Shimane, Ochi-gun; Nagasaki, Kagoshima, Kikaijima; and in Koshikijima. Keigo located variants from Ehime, Hiroshima, Iwate, Kagoshima, Kochi, Nagasaki, Niigata, and Shimane. In addition, Riftin argued that tales about a hero gaining an object from a marine deity only appear in coastal Southwestern Japan and near Korea, which would indicate that the story migrated from the continent.

=== East Asia ===
==== China ====
In the first catalogue of Chinese folktales (devised by Eberhard in 1937), Wolfram Eberhard abstracted a similar opening, indexed as number 39, Der Drachenkönig erfüllt einen Wunsch ("The Dragon King fulfills a wish"): the protagonist rescues the Dragon King's child (his son or his daughter), who appears in the shape of a carp (or in one case, a mussel); in gratitude, the protagonist is taken to the underwater palace and is offered a present; following a servant's advice, the protagonist chooses the gift, and gains either a wife (the Dragon King's daughter) or an object that grants him riches. He dated some of the Chinese variants to the time of the Sung dynasty, and others to the time of the Tang dynasty.

Chinese folklorist and scholar Ting Nai-tung established a second typological classification of Chinese folktales (the first was by Wolfram Eberhard in the 1930s). In his new system, he noted that Chinese variants of type 465, "The Man Persecuted Because of his Beautiful Wife", may be preceded with another tale type he dubbed 555*, "The Grateful Dragon Prince (Princess)". In the latter type, the hero rescues an animal (fish, turtle, serpent) or gives offering to a water deity. The animal reveals he is a Dragon Prince and takes the hero to his father's underwater court. Down there, the hero is given a box with a bird inside (a pheasant, a hen) and takes it with him back to land. The animal leaves the box and becomes a woman; the man sees her and she tells him she is a daughter of the Dragon King (a Dragon Princess). They marry and the tale segues into type 465. Sinologist Boris Riftin stated that variants appear "mainly" in Eastern China, namely, in Shandong, Zhejiang, Guangdong, Sichuan and Hebei.

===== Regional tales =====
Lowell Edmunds, in his book Stealing Helen, provided a Chinese variant titled Long nüe ("Dragon Girl"): an elder brother tries to get rid of his younger brother by locking him in a trunk and casting him downstream. The youth begins to play on his bamboo flute, which draws the attention of the aquatic Dragon King. The deity sends two dispatches to get the human to his underwater palace, where he spends some time. Before he departs, the dispatches advise the human to ask for the Dragon King's pup as reward, since the little animal is the daughter of a goddess. The youth takes the pup with him to the human world and it becomes a beautiful maiden and they marry. Some time into their marriage, a servant of the emperor sights the maiden and reports back to the emperor. The emperor first tasks the humble flute player with providing an army in three days time. His supernatural wife helps him and creates the army for the emperor. The emperor then sends guards to take the maiden by force, but the humble man tricks the emperor and gains her back.

In a Chinese tale titled Two Magic Gourds, an 18-year-old youth named Wang Xiang lives a poor life with his mother in the mountains, and earns his living selling firewood. One day, he stops to rest by a tree and finds two fine-looking gourds. He cuts off the vines and brings the gourds home with him. Later, a fortune teller comes to his house and explains the gourds are magical: one can dry up the sea and the other can break down mountains. The fortune teller offers to buy them, but the youth denies her. Some time later, the gourds ripen, and Wang Xiang tosses one of them in the sea: the sea recedes some li. Suddenly, a "swarthy-looking" yaksha appears out of the sea and asks Wang Xiang to accompany him to the underwater palace of Dragon King for a talk. Wang Xiang doubts his intentions, but the yaksha assures that, if he complies, he can ask for a bamboo cylinder that grants an endless supply of rice, and for the little puppy that sleeps by the Dragon King's throne. Wang Xiang goes to the Dragon King's palace, and is asked to take the gourd back. In return, the Dragon King allows the youth to ask for anything: he asks for the bamboo cylinder and the little puppy (which is the Dragon King's daughter). The marine monarch agrees to part with the puppy and the bamboo cylinder, and Wang Xiang takes the gourd with him back to the surface. When he steps on land, the sea is restored to normal, and the puppy becomes a beautiful maiden who introduces herself as the Dragon King's daughter and says she wants to be his wife. Despite some doubts about his financial standing, the maiden wishes to be with him, and he need not worry. That same night, while her husband and her mother-in-law are asleep, the maiden summons sea creatures (fishes, turtles, shrimps and crabs) to help her build a larger house for them. Later, a local county magistrate sights Wang Xiang's wife and desires her for himself. He goes to Wang Xiang and demands he surrenders his wife to him. Wang Xiang refuses, so the magistrate orders him to perform impossible feats: first, to plant a willow tree upside down; next, to push down a mountain. On the second task, he uses his second gourd and crumbles the mountain on the magistrate and his cohorts, and lives in peace with his wife.

In a tale from the Hui people, recorded in 1978 in Ningxia with the title Mansuer, a poor shepherd named Mansuer herds sheep for local landlord Dulaxi, and is given leftovers to eat. One day, he sees a black snake biting a white one, whips the black one away and heals the white reptile. Later, he has a dream where an ahong with a white beard tells him to accompany the man in white on a white horse, not the man on the black. Just as the dream predicted, a man in white appears to Mansuer and asks he youth to accompany him. The man in white creates a sheep corral to hold the sheep in, and takes Mansuer to his father's court: the Dragon King's underwater palace. Mansuer is greeted by the Dragon King with a feast, and tells the youth to ask for anything as payment for saving his daughter. Mansuer, as he was previously instructed by the man in white (who is actually a girl), requests a single flower. The Dragon King agrees to part with the flower, and says his goodbyes to the human. Back on land, Mansuer goes home to place the flower in a crack in the wall, and goes to tend the sheep. After he returns home, he notices that his straw bed is now covered with a mattress and sheets of red satin. He then looks at the flower, who turns into a girl before his eyes. The girl declares herself to be Mansuer's wife, and they live together. The next day, Dulaxi's son Hasai goes to Mansuer's cottage and sees the shepherd's beautiful wife. He reports back to his father, and both conspire to kill Mansuer and take the girl as a wife for Hasai. The following days, Dulaxi imposes impossible tasks on Mansuer: first, he has to gather enough firewood, as large as a hill; then, he must fetch the chopping block, located in the wolves' den; thirdly, to dig out a fire pit large as the sea, place a pan on it and boil water with three pieces of wood; lastly, for Mansuer to go down in the boiling water. With his wife's advice, he fulfills the first two tasks, and, once again advised by her, goes to the sea and asks his father-in-law, the Dragon King, for an iron scoop to dig out the fire pit. As for the last task, the Dragon King's daughter gives her husband some bracelets he puts on and survives the boiling water, rising out of the water with some lumps of gold. Driven by greed, Dulaxi and his son Hasai try to replicate Mansuer's act, and boil to death.

==== Mongolia ====
According to Boris L. Riftin, variants of the tale type are attested in the Oirat and Mongolian versions of the compilation The Bewitched Corpse.

German linguist Bernhard Jülg translated a Mongolian tale from the Siddi Kur ("The Bewitched Corpse") wherein an Indian king's animal tamer releases a dancing golden frog back to the water and later rescues a white serpent from the clutches of an eagle. The golden frog and the white serpent each tell the tamer they are the children of the Lord of Dragons that guards the shells with white pearls. The tamer is taken to their father's underwater palace as a thank you and spends some time there. After a while, the tamer wants to return to land, and as a parting gift the Dragon Lord gives the man a red-furred she-dog as companion and a magical jewel. Back on land, the tamer discovers the red-furred she-dog becomes a beautiful woman and burns the canine skin. They marry. One day, the Dragon Lord's daughter, now human, is kidnapped by a lustful human king who intends to marry her. However, she secretly summons her human husband to concoct a plan to be enacted the following year, during the month of Pausha: the husband disguises himself with a crude and grotesque design and takes part in the celebrations. British author Rachel Harriette Busk translated the tale as different chapters of her book Sagas from the Far East: in the first, titled The White Serpent-King, the gold frog states the she is the daughter of the Serpent King (who still lives in an underwater palace); in the second, titled What became of the Red-coloured Dog, the tamer burns the red dog's skin to keep the woman in human form.

Russian ethnographer Grigory Potanin collected an Ordos Mongolian tale from a teller in Uxin. In this tale, titled "Шацгай ханъ (царь-сорока)" ("Magpie Tsar"), a boy leaves home to learn a trade, and he goes back after he learns to play the khur (a musical instrument). His father is disappointed and banishes him from home. The boy wanders off to the edge of a lake and plays the khur until he dozes off. When he wakes up, a man appears to him and invites him to play at the wedding of Chagan Losun Khan's daughter, at the bottom of the lake. The boy accompanies the man to the underwater world and plays at the wedding for seven days. The man advises him to ask as payment for the yellow dog and a door latch. The boy gets the dog and the latch and goes back to the human world. He finds a seemingly empty large yurt and lives with the yellow dog as his companion. When he sleeps, the yellow dog takes off the dogskin, becomes a human maiden and prepares the food. The khur player awakes, sees the dogskin and burns it. The maiden admonishes that he was too hasty. Men from Shatsgai khan's retinue come to the boy's yurt and cook some meat in their bonfire, but let it be overcooked when they see the khur player's wife. Sensing their fear, the wife cooks for them new pieces of meat that they bring to Shatsgai khan. The khan is delighted at the tasty meat and notices it is not the one they brought from the hunt. The servants tell the khan about the beautiful maiden in the yurt. The khan goes to meet the maiden and her husband and proposes a game: both the khan and the boy shall hide, and one shall find the other; whoever wins gets the throne. The khur player wins by hiding with his wife's help and finding the khan. Still not wanting to admit defeat, the khan sets a new test: let their horses run wild; whichever returns first shall be declared the victor. The khur player is advised by his wife to go to the edge of the lake and ask his father-in-law for an eight-legged horse and a four-legged lion. Then, the khan orders the khur player to boil water in a tokum. The boy also traverses a lake twice, but the khan fails.

==== Buryat people ====
In a tale from the Buryat people collected in Russian with the title "Сирота и желтая собака" (Buryat: Унышен хубун, transliteration: Unyshen hubun; English: "The Orphan and the Yellow Dog"), an orphan boy lives with his stepmother and grazes a red ox. One day, he takes the red ox to graze by the "yellow sea" and finds some people fishing a golden dace (the daughter of Lusun Khan). He trades his red ox for the fish, but regrets his decision soon after. However, the dace appears to him and tells the boy that, if his stepmother scolds him, he should come back to that same shore and walk until he finds a large silver palace with a white-bearded man inside, and ask for his yellow-furred dog, and keep insisting on the request even after the man sends him away. The dace's words prove to be true, and the boy goes to the silver palace and requests the man's yellow dog, despite the man's objections. The man concedes and gives the man a paper and his dog, and warns him not to open up the paper roll until a certain place. The orphan boy walks a bit and unrolls the paper: the dog becomes a woman, and a house and a cattle appear nearby. The orphan and the woman live together as man and wife. One day, the son of the local Hartagai Khan is hunting nearby, and sees the woman inside the house, falling in love with her, then returns to his father's court to tell he wants the poor orphan's wife. Hartagai Khan's son then plans to get rid of the orphan by playing a game of hide and seek with him, then, after losing it, asking him to find answers about the age of the bear and the mother of the sun. After he talks to the mother of the sun, he is given a red hen to bring back to Hartagai Khan. The bird begins to speak and the khan and his son die.

==== Tibet ====
In a Tibetan tale translated into Russian with the title "Девушка-дракон" ("The Dragon Girl"), a father dies and his three sons, named First Brother, Second Brother and Third Brother divide their inheritance: a golden box, a silver box and a wooden box. Third Brother takes the wooden box and goes to live a humble life. One day, he rescues a little snake from an eagle and places the animal under his hat. He then walks a bit more and hears two yaks talking about their son. Third Brother goes on a bit more and finds two other yaks commenting about their grandchild. The youth shows them the little snake, who they recognize as their grandchild. The yaks invite the human to their underwater palace. The next day, Third Brother goes to the lake and is taken to the underwater palace. He spends some time there, and meets the grandmother (one of the yaks), who advises him to asks three gifts from the Dragon King: a bull's tail, a woolen carpet and the Dragon King's little spotted dog. Third Brother follows the instructions and rejects the extravagant gifts of jewels and weapons. He takes the three objects with him to his humble house and sleeps. The next day, the woolen carpet changes his house and the bull's tail generates herds of sheep and cows for him. As for the dog, it does a somersault and becomes a human maiden. Third Brother spies on her becoming human and burns the dog skin. The maiden tells him she is the youngest daughter of the Dragon King and that she has come to live with him, and that the dog skin was for her protection. Resigned to her fate, the Dragon King's daughter and Third Brother live as husband and wife. However, a local king learns of the humble man and his beautiful wife and decides to have her for himself, so he devises three difficult tasks for Third Brother; if he fails, he shall forfeit his possessions and wife to him. The Dragon King's daughter helps her human husband. In an abridged form of the tale, translated into Russian by Tibetologist Yuri Parfionovich with the title "Бедняк и дочь дракона" ("The Poor Man and the Dragon's Daughter"), the poor man rescues the snake and returns the animal to two knights, one on a white horse, and another on a black horse - both emissaries of the marine Dragon King. In the English language translation, titled The Poor Man and the Serpent's Daughter, the supernatural wife is described as the daughter of the Serpent King (who is still identified as a marine deity).

In a Tibetan tale published by A. L. Shelton with the title The Story of the Violinist, a father sends his three sons into the world to learn a trade and return home. The oldest becomes a writer, the second one a carpenter and the youngest a violinist. The father expels his youngest son from home, and he travels to another kingdom near a black sea. One day, the violinist sees a black snake and a white snake fighting, and he saves the white snake. Some time later, a white-haired woman appears to thank the youth for saving the son of the king of the lower regions, the white snake, and invites him to go with her to his palace. She also explains that his daughter is very beautiful, but hides her face underneath a chicken skin. The fiddler is taken by the woman to the king's palace and asks for the hen as his reward. The daughter of the king of the lower regions agrees to go with the human, and takes with her a golden pick, a golden chain, and a brass blessing cup. They return to land and live as husband and wife, and become very rich. The local monarch, a wicked man, is invited by the fiddler to his house for a banquet, and he notices the fiddler's wife. He takes her with him and orders the fiddler to level a mountain, to turn a small pond into a forested lake, and to show him hell. The fiddler accomplishes the outlandish tasks with his wife's help and items she brought with herself to the surface.

Russian ethnographer Grigory Potanin collected a "Tangut" (19th century designation for Tibetan people) tale he titled "Дочь Водянаго Царя" ("Daughter of the Water King"): a youth hits a whirlwind that burrows underground and goes to tell the king. The king sends some men with the youth and they rescue a princess from underground, but the king's men abandon the youth in the hole. He finds a dragon in hole that asks the human to stay with it until it regains its health. Fully recovered, the dragon takes the youth to the court of the Water King, since the dragon is his daughter, and advises him to ask for a piece of wood and a black donkey. The Water King welcomes the human youth and asks him to choose his reward for protecting his daughter. The youth chooses the piece of the wood and the donkey, then returns home. He plants the wood outside his house and goes to sleep. A woman comes out of the wood, cleans the place and prepares the food, then goes back to the wood. The youth learns of this and burns the wood to strand the woman in the mortal realm, and marries her. Some time later, he decides to invite the human king to his house, despite his wife's warnings. The human king visits the youth and becomes enamoured with the youth's wife. The human king then plans to get rid of the youth and take his wife for himself, by ordering some tasks: to build a bridge between the royal palace and the youth's house; then, to plant trees along it, and to roll out a carpet between both houses. Seeing that the youth accomplished all tasks - with his wife's magical help -, the king decides to make a deadlier contest between him and the youth: to see whose dog is stronger, then who is capable of digging out a mountain, and finally, whose army is stronger.

In a Tibetan tale translated as The Castle in the Lake, rumors and stories surround a certain lake in the mountains, where people swear they can see a castle reflected in its waters: "Castle Lake". One day, poor shepherd Rinchen takes his yaks to graze near the lake, and goes to rest a bit. Reflecting on his life and the demands of his cruel mother, he sheds tears, then finishes his meal. Suddenly, a tall man wearing a west black chuba appears to him and inquires the boy about his sadness, then bids the boy come to him to his master, the king of the castle in the lake, for he might help him with his problems. Rinchen accompanies the tall man into the underwater castle and meets the king. After the tall man explains the situation, the king gives Rinchen a dog, which is to be given food before the boy eats anything. Rinchen returns home with the dog and follows the king's orders: whenever he wakes up, this barley chest and butter chest are filled, there is money and clothes appear in the chest, to his surprise. One day, his mother wants to take the yaks to pasture, while his son is away at home: Rinchen hides himself and sees the little dog walk to the hearth, shake itself off and become a beautiful human maiden, the dogskin at her feet. While she proceeds to fill the chests in the house with barley and butter, the boy rushes to fetch the dogskin and burn it to keep the maiden human forever, but, since she is beautiful, he fears the chief's son may take her away from him, so he dirties her face with soot. In time, Rinchen grows even richer, and, growing bold, decides to clean off the soot from his wife's face. When he goes with her to the town to show his wife, the chief's son sees her and becomes enamoured, so he orders some guards to seize her and bring her to him. Rinchen loses his wife and goes to cry at the shore of the lake. The same tall man appears again, hears his story and takes him again to the underwater castle. The king gives him a box this time, with instructions: the boy is to climb a mountain, call the chief's son for a battle and open the box: an army will spring forth at his disposal to fight against the chief's son's soldiers. It happens thus: Rinchen manages to recover his wife and becomes the ruler in the chief's son's place.

=== Central Asia ===
Folklorist Erika Taube stated that the tale type was very popular in Central Asia. In these variants, the hero saves the child of a supernatural entity (e.g., the king of snakes, the king of the underworld, the king of Heaven, Khurbust Khan), and in gratitude their father gives the hero a box or an animal as companion. Either the box contains the supernatural wife, or the animal becomes the supernatural wife. Either way, marital life is not an idyllic one, for they have to fend off the advances of a human lord, who wishes to have the supernatural woman to himself.

==== Tuvan people ====
In a Tuvan tale titled "Оскюс-оол и Золотая царевна" ("Oskyus-ool and the Golden Princess"), a youth named Oskyus-ool lives with his dying father and a little goat herd. His father asks the youth to bury him under a white stone near the Arzayty Mountains, and for him to move near the Golden Lake. The youth fulfills his father's last wish and travels to the Golden Lake. On the road there, he meets a white-bearded rider on a white horse, who mocks him, and a black-bearded rider on a black horse, who gives him directions. He reaches the shores of the Chinge-Kara-Kham river, where people are gathering for a suitor challenge: the local Bai Khan will marry his daughter, the princess, to anyone who can bring her water from a place behind Kara-Dag Mountains. Oskyus-ool decides to take part in the contest, but quits and makes his way to the Golden Lake. After he settles there, one day he sees two fisherman with a goldfish, and trades his father's satchel for the little fish, which he places in a small pond he digs out. Every day, he finds near the goldfish plenty of fishes for him, until the fish vanishes some time later. Suddenly, a man on a red horse appears out of the lake and bids him come with him to the bottom of the lake, to visit his master, Dalai Khan. On the way there, the man explains his master, the ruler of the lake, wants to thank the human youth for saving his daughter when she played near the surface, but advises the boy to choose as his reward only a small red dog that lies near the feet of Dalai Khan. After they reach Dalai Khan's large white yurt, the youth does as instructed and is given the red dog. Back to the surface, however, he begins to question his decision, until the dog brings him a hare from the woods. He lives with the dog as his pet, until one morning the animal is nowhere to be seen, save for a large yurt in the distance. He enters the yurt and finds a beautiful maiden with black braids inside, a dog skin near her feet. She explains she is Dalai Khan's daughter and welcomes him. As she is distracted, Oskyus-ool burns the dog skin, but the maiden admonishes him against having done so. They settle into a routine, until one day Karaty Khan, on a hunt, sends some servant to get provisions in the Golden Princess's yurt, and are agape at her beauty. They later report their findings to Karaty Khan, who wishes to have her for himself. The next day, he visits her yurt, and decides Oskyus-ool and him should trade houses. For three days, while the khan is at the Golden Princess's yurt, she avoids his advances by cursing him to occupy himself with a task: first, outside the yurt; on the second, near the door; on the third, near the hearth. Humiliated, Karaty Khan decides to wage war on the youth. The Golden Princess then advises the youth to go to the shore of the Golden Lake and ask for her father's help. He goes there and a servant appears with an iron box. Oskyus-ool takes the box and opens it, releasing his own army to defeat the khan's.

=== Kalmyk people ===
A very similar story is attested in the Kalmyk Folktale Corpus, as summarized by philologist researcher Irina S. Nadbitova, who classified it as type 449, "Царевна-собака" ("The Dog-Princess"). In this narrative, the humble hero saves the son of the Dragon King, who grants him a little she-dog; the man returns to land and the she-dog becomes a lovely maiden who marries him, but the khan lusts after her.

=== Southern Asia ===
==== Bhutan ====
Author Kunzang Choden published a Bhutanese tale titled The Shepherd: a poor shepherd grazes his sheep near a lake. He then sees a white rat and a black rat fighting, the black rat clearly superior. The shepherd intervenes and protects the white rat. Some time later, two women come out of the lake and introduce themselves as emissaries of the subterranean king; the white rat was his son. As thanks, the subterranean king invites the man to his court. The shepherd goes to the underground world and is advised to choose as a reward a simple looking dog. The subterranean king is reluctant at first to part with the dog, but concedes and lets the shepherd have it. The youth goes home with the dog. Back home to the "middle world", the shepherd keeps the dog at home and grazes the sheep. He goes back home and the place is clean and the meal prepared. The shepherd discovers the dog takes off its skin and becomes a human maiden. While she is away at the lake making an oblation to her father, Tsuena Rinchen, the king of the subterranean world, the shepherd burns the dogskin. He marries the now human daughter of the subterranean king. Some time later, a king from the human world sees the shepherd's wife and becomes enamoured of her, and decides to send the youth on impossible demands: to raze a whole forest in a mountain, to create a wheat field and then harvest the grain. With his wife's family's help, the shepherd prevails: his family-in-law gift him a box filled with swords to raze the forest; one with hoes to plant the grains; and lastly one with birds to harvest them. Finally, enraged at the poor shepherd's success, the human king decides to attack him with his personal army, and the shepherd's parents-in-law give him a fourth box which with he summons his own army to defeat the king's.

==== Lapcha people ====
In a tale collected from a Lapcha informant named Yanku-sarang Mangal, in Kasseon (Sikhim), with the title A Fairy Disguised as a Puppy, a poor orphan boy lives alone and catches fishes to feed himself. One day, he finds a large fish that he intends to use as his food source, but the fish pleads for its life and suggests it can take the boy to its mother and father down the river. The boy agrees and is taken to a royal couple that live in the river, who thank the boy for sparing their child and wish to reward him with something. The boy sees a small puppy near the throne and asks for the animal as his reward, then returns home. One day, he notices that, after he returns home, his food is cooked for him, and decides to investigate: the little puppy takes off its skin to become a beautiful maiden with the colour of golden in her upper body and silver in her lower body. The orphan boy takes the skin to burn it, to the maiden's sadness, and they live together in his cottage. Later, a local king finds the poor boy's beautiful wife and desires to have her for himself, so he sets trials against him: first, the boy must win a cock-fight contest, then a bull-fight contest, and lastly with armies. The poor boy is advised by his supernatural wife to ask for her parents' help by going to the river: he asks for a medium-sized cock to battle the king's bird, then a bull, and finally for a medium-sized box that produces its own army. With his parents-in-law's gifts, he beats the king and is crowned king in his place.

In another tale from the Lepcha people, collected by Danish ethnologist Halfdan Siiger from an informant named Tsering with the title The Story of an Orphan Boy, an orphan boy lives alone and goes to hunt in the forest. One day, he sees an eagle poised to attack an eight-year-old boy who is the son of lu pŭ nŭ, an underground god. The orphan boy shoots at the eagle and rescues the other boy, who, in gratitude, asks him to accompany him to his underground realm to meet his father. The underground god welcomes the human boy and lets him stay for seven days. During this time, the human orphan boy falls in love with lu pŭ nŭ's daughter, who, to be with him, advises him to ask her father only for the coat of a dog if the deity offers material wealth to him. When the orphan boy decides to return home, he does as instructed and gets the dog-coat, then returns to earth. The story then explains that when the orphan boy returned to the surface world, wild and domestic animals came with him to populate the Earth. Back to the boy, he goes back home with the coat and leaves it at home, unaware that the underground deity's daughter is inside it. The boy goes to hunt in the morning and, when he returns home, everything is prepared for him, so he decides to investigate and finds the girl coming out of the dog coat. He burns the dog coat, takes the girl as his wife, and becomes very rich, richer that the local king of the place where the sun sets, the tsŭk kyār pŭ nŭ. Some time later, the king sends some emissaries to check on the orphan boy's wealth and learns of the boy's dealing with the underground god and his daughter. Since the king had a wife with a large boil on her neck, he decides to force the boy on contests so he can seize the daughter of lu pŭ nŭ as his wife: first, they will have a cockfighting contest; next, a goat-fighting contest; and thirdly a bull-fighting one. The daughter of lu pŭ nŭ advises her husband to go back to the place where they returned from the underground and asks her father for help: he sends first a cockerel, then a kid, and another bull to fight - and beat - the king's animals. Finally, exhausted of the defeats, the king sets a final trial for the orphan boy: his subjects against the orphan's. The orphan is gifted a box from his father-in-law, which he initially opens and released one of two thunderbolts, and uses the box to fight against the king's army by releasing the second thunderbolt and killing them.

=== Chuang people ===
In a tale from the Chuang people titled The Third Son and the Magistrate, three sons, after their father dies, each learn a trade: the elder becomes an idler and starves to death; the middle brother plants vegetables and becomes a gardener; the youngest sees some fishermen in the river and decides to become one. One day, he catches a carp alongside other fishes, and takes care of it. A man appears some time later, reveals the carp was him, a son of the Dragon King, and takes the fisherman to his father's underwater court. The human gains a white chicken, which is the disguise of a daughter of the Dragon King. The Dragon King's daughter reveals herself and marries the human. A local magistrate sees the human form of the Dragon King's daughter - now on land with her husband - and wishes to possess her, so he sets impossible tasks for the humble fisherman: first, to catch 120 red carps of same size and weight; next, for the fisherman's wife to weave a bolt of blue cloth as long as the road; thirdly, to produce a flock of red sheep; lastly, to bring 120 monsters to the magistrate. The man accomplishes every task with the help of his wife and her underwater family.

=== Shor people ===
In a tale from the Shor people, titled "ЧАГЫС - ОДИНОКИЙ ПАРЕНЬ" ("Chagys, the Lonely Fellow"), a poor man trades his sheep for a pike caught by fishermen and releases the fish back to the sea. Some time later, an emissary of the хозяин (master) of the waters demands his presence in the underwater court. Down there, the man learns the pike is the son of the master of the water and asks as reward a little red-furred dog. Chagys returns to land with the little dog. For two days, he sleeps and wakes up to see that his house is clean and the food prepared. On the third day, he discovers a copper-haired girl in his house (the human form of the little dog). He touches her and she is taken aback, saying that the son of the master of the water will come for them. The creature comes, as predicted, and offers to play a game of hide and seek with Chagys - whoever wins, gets the copper-haired girl (tale type ATU 329, "Hiding from the Devil (Princess)"). The son of the master of the water hides first: first, as a ram with twisted horns; then, as a bull, and later as a crested bird. With the girl's help, Chagys locates him every time. When it is his turn, the girl turns Chagys first into a comb, then as a thimble, and finally into a needle. The son of the master of the water cannot find him, and Chagys wins. As a last resort, the master of the water orders Chagys to search for a golden table in "such and such a place". The copper-haired girl gives the man some provisions for the road and advises him to cast a ball of yarn and follow it wherever it stops. Chagys follows the ball of yarn and reaches the houses of the girl's three sisters, each older than the last. He learns from the eldest sister where to get the golden table. Chagys rides a six-legged horse to a mountain top, steals the table from a shaman and rides back to the eldest sister. On the journey back, he declares he wants some food and dishes appear on the table. Chagys proclaims he wishes to eat with a companion and the invisible spirit of the golden table eats with him. The man returns home with the table and the son of the master of the water concedes defeat.

== See also ==
- Toyotama-hime
- Urashima Taro
- Go I Know Not Whither and Fetch I Know Not What
- The Golden-Headed Fish
