= Go I Know Not Whither and Fetch I Know Not What =

Russian fairy tale

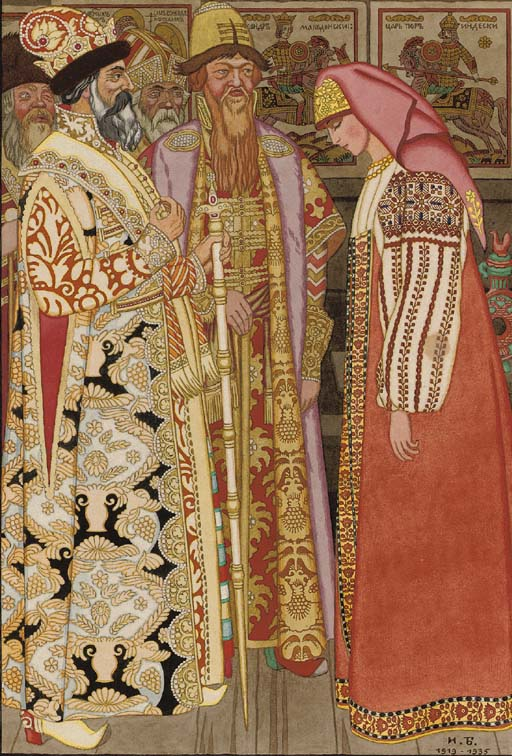
- Illustration by Ivan Bilibin.

Folk tale
- Name: Go I Know Not Whither and Fetch I Know Not What
- Aarne–Thompson grouping: ATU 465, "The Man persecuted because of his beautiful wife"
- Mythology: Slavic
- Country: Russia
- Region: Russia, Eurasia
- Published in: Narodnye russkie skazki
- Related: The Wife from the Dragon Palace

Go I Know Not Whither and Fetch I Know Not What (Russian: Пойди туда, не знаю куда, принеси то, не знаю что, translit. Poydi tuda, ne znau kuda, prinesi to, ne znau chto) is a Russian fairy tale collected by Alexander Afanasyev in Narodnye russkie skazki.

== Synopsis ==
A royal hunter shoots a bird; wounded, it begs him not to kill it but to take it home, and when it goes to sleep, strike its head. He does so, and the bird becomes a beautiful woman. She proposes that they marry, and they do. After the marriage, she sees how hard he has to hunt and tells him to borrow one or two hundred rubles. He does so, and then buys silks with them. She conjures two spirits and sets them to make a marvelous carpet. Then she gives the carpet to her husband and tells him to accept whatever price he is given. The merchants do not know how much to pay for it, and finally, the king's steward buys it for ten thousand rubles. The king sees it and gives the steward twenty-five thousand for it.

The steward goes to the hunter's house to get another and sees his wife. He falls madly in love with her, and the king sees it. The steward tells him why, and the king goes himself and sees the hunter's wife. He decides that he should marry her instead and demands the steward devise a way to be rid of the husband. The steward, with a stranger's advice, has him sent to the land of the dead to ask of the former King's behavior, in the hope that he never returns. The hunter being told of this tells his wife. She gives him a magic ring and says that he must take the king's steward with him as a witness, to prove that he really has visited the Underworld. He does. After their return and seeing how the King's father was punished by the devils for his sins, the hunter thinks he fulfilled his duty, but the King becomes angry and just sends him back home. But who really gets the anger of the monarch, is the steward, who is ordered again to find another way to let the hunter disappear, or else the steward will be executed. The man asks again for advice from the stranger and he/she tells him to catch a large man-eating magical cat called Bajun who lives on an iron column in the thrice tenth kingdom. But against all their evil plans, the hunter catches the beast, with the help of his wife.

The king is enraged with the steward, who again goes to the same stranger. This time, the steward tells the king to send the hunter to "go I know not whither and bring back I know not what." The wife conjures spirits and all the beasts and birds to see if they know how to "go I know not whither and bring back I know not what." Then she goes out to sea and summons all the fish. But none of them can help her, so she gives him a ball, which if rolled before him would lead him where he needs to go, and a handkerchief, with directions to wipe his face with it whenever he washes. He leaves. The king sends a carriage for his "wife". She turns back into a bird and leaves.

Her husband finally comes to the old witch Baba Yaga. She gives him food and lets him rest; then she brings him water to wash. He wipes his face not with their towel but his handkerchief. She recognizes it as their sister's. She questions him, and he tells his story. The witch, who had never heard of something like that, knows an old frog who she thinks may know something.

Baba Yaga gives him a jug to carry the frog, which can not walk fast enough. He does so, and the frog directs him to a river, where it tells him to get on the frog, and it swells large enough to carry him across. There, it directs him to listen to the old men who will arrive soon. He does and hears them summon "Shmat Razum" to serve them. Then the old men leave, and he hears Shmat Razum lament how they treated him. The men ask Shmat Razum to serve the hunter instead, and Shmat Razum agrees.

Shmat Razum carries him back. The hunter stops at a golden arbor, where he meets three merchants. With Shmat Razum's directions, he exchanges his servant for three marvels, which could summon up a garden, a fleet of ships, and an army. But after a day, Shmat Razum returns to the hunter.

In his own country, the hunter has Shmat Razum build a castle. His wife returns to him there. The former king of the country sees the castle and marches against the hunter. The new king, with the help of his wife, summons the fleet and the army. They defeat the other king and the hunter is chosen as the king in his place.

== Analysis ==
=== Tale type ===
Russian scholarship classifies the tale, in the East Slavic Folktale Classification (Russian: СУС, romanized: SUS), as tale type SUS 465A, "Красавица-жена («Пойди туда, не знаю куда»)" ("Beautiful Wife ('Go Somewhere, I Don't Know Where')"): a royal archer (or a poor man) marries a supernatural maiden; the emperor, wishing to have her to himself, sends the archer on difficult quests he accomplishes with his wife's help. The East Slavic type corresponds, in the international Aarne–Thompson–Uther Index, to type ATU 465, "The Man persecuted because of his beautiful wife", and its former subtype, AaTh 465A, "The Quest for the Unknown". This tale type involves a unmarried man capturing an animal and bringing it home. When the man is not at home, the animal takes off its animal skin and becomes a beautiful maiden. The hunter returns, burns the skin and marries the maiden. Some time later, an emperor, lord or nobleman of superior rank lusts after the wife of supernatural origin and sends the mortal husband on impossible quests.

In the third revision of the international index, German folklorist Hans-Jörg Uther subsumed subtypes AaTh 465A, AaTh 465B, AaTh 465C and AaTh 465D under a single tale type, ATU 465.

=== Role of the animal bride ===
Professor Susan Hoogasian-Villa mentioned variants where the hero (a prince or a hunter) marries a maiden that becomes an aquatic animal (mostly fish, but sometimes a frog or a tortoise) or a kind of bird. Graham Anderson also noted that the supernatural wife in this tale type appears to show "amphibious connections", since she wears the disguise of a water animal (fish, turtle, frog).

Scholars Ibrahim Muhawi and Sharif Kanaana, in the Arab and Palestinian parallels they gathered, noted that the human husband is a fisherman "in most other [tales]". Likewise, Greek researcher Marilena Papachristophorou described that, in Greek variants, the animal bride comes in the shape of a turtle and the human husband is "usually a fisherman". Folklorist Lev Barag noted the resemblance between a Belarusian variant and tales from Asian peoples wherein a poor and destitute youth marries the daughter of a god.

Scholar Joanna Hubbs interpreted the tale under a mythological lens, and stated that the female characters of the story are representations of a powerful female divinity. Thus, in the tale, the male hunter achieves the happy ending due to the actions of his wife and her magical family. Likewise, scholars Ibrahim Muhawi and Sharif Kanaana stated that "in each case [of every tale]", the male protagonist is helped by his wife and her relatives (mother and/or sisters).

=== Role of the hero's rival ===
Some scholars point out the hero's main rival may be his own father. The paternal antagonist also occurs in Greek variants, according to scholars Anna Angelopoulou and Aigle Broskou.

Armenian scholarship suggests that tale type ATU 465 underlies a theme of incest, reminiscent of the Greek myth of Oedipus. For instance, Tamar Hayrapetyan argues that an "archaic" version may preserve the hero's father lusting after his own daughter-in-law, while later tradition excises the incest theme altogether and replaces the father for a stranger.

== Variants ==
Professor Stith Thompson argued that the tale is "essentially East European", "at home in Russia", but could also be found in the Near East, in Baltic and Scandinavian countries. According to Japanese scholar Seki Keigo, the tale type is "common in eastern Europe, India, and China".

=== Literary predecessors ===
The oldest attestation of the tale type is found in ancient East Asian literature of the 7th century, namely Chinese and Japanese. Seki Keigo pinned down its appearance in some literary collections of his country, such as in Nihongi, the Ryoi-ki and the Sangoku Denki.

Scholar David Blamires argues for the existence of the tale type in the medieval work Gesta Romanorum. In the tale, an emperor is desirous to possess not the knight's wife, but the knight's lands, and orders him to bring a black horse, a black falcon, a black dog and a black horn. The knight's wife guides her husband through the impossible quest.

=== Europe ===
Professor Jack V. Haney stated that subtypes 465A and 465C appear as the "typical combination" in East Slavic, Baltic and Turkic, but type 465C only appears in Northeastern Europe and in Turkic traditions.

In a "Cossack" (Ukrainian) tale, The Story of Ivan and the Daughter of the Sun, the peasant Ivan obtains a wife in the form of a dove maiden whose robe he stole when she was bathing. Some time later, a nobleman lusts after Ivan's dove maiden wife and plans to get rid of the peasant.

In an Armenian variant, The Maiden of the Sea (translated to French and republished as La fille de la mer), a poor widow, on her deathbed, instructs her only son to throw a loaf of bread into the sea, just as she did in life. One day, the youth arrives home and sees the place all clean and tidy. Suspecting something is amiss, the boy stays in waiting and sees a fish coming out of the sea and taking their fishskin off, revealing itself to be a beautiful maiden. The youth seizes her and she screams for help, to which a voice claims from the sea that the human is its son-in-law. The fish maiden and the youth marry and, one day, the Prince, passing by their cottage, sights the maiden and becomes enamored with her. He then orders her husband to meet his outlandish demands.

Baltic variants of the tale type (formerly AaTh 465A), like Žaibas ir Perkūnas tabokinėje, attest the presence of Baltic thunder god Perkūnas.

In one Estonian variant, the human husband acquires a maiden from above as his wife, and in another the mother-in-law is the ruler of the Sun.

==== Russia ====
In a tale by Bernard Isaacs, Go I Know Not Where, Fetch I Know Not What, the hunter shoots a turtledove, which transforms into a maiden called Tsarevna Marya. When the hunter goes on the quest for the "something" the Tsar wants, he meets Baba Yaga, who the narrative describes as the mother of his wife.

In a tale translated by Jeremiah Curtin, Go to the Verge of Destruction and Bring Back Shmat-Razum, one of the king's sharpshooters, named Fedot, spares a blue dove and she becomes a "soul-maiden", a lovely tsar's daughter. When her husband is tasked with bringing back "Shmat-Razum", he meets three princesses and their aged mother - her wife's family. The tale was also translated by Nisbet Bain with the title Go I Know Not Whither—Fetch I Know Not What.

In a tale published by journalist Post Wheeler, Schmat-Razum, the bowman Taraban, while on a hunt, sees seven white ducks with silver wings beneath a tree. When they alight near the "sea-ocean", the seven birds take off their silver wings and become maidens. Taraban hides the silver wings of one of them. The other six white ducks depart, but one stays behind. The maiden asks the stranger to give her wings back and, if they are a youth, she will marry him. They marry, but Taraban shows up at court to explain to the Tzar he married without his permission. Taraban presents his wife to the Tzar and his court, and they decide to send the bowman to look for "Schmat-Razum", to try to get rid of him.

In a tale translated by Charles Downing as I know-not-what of I-know-not-where, the archer is called Petrushka. While on a hunt, he finds an injured dove and brings it home. The dove becomes a human girl named Masha, the Dove Maiden. After a while the emperor becomes enamored with Masha, and sends her husband on an errand to find "I-Know-Not-What" in a place called "I-Know-Not-Where". The archer completes the task with the help of Baba Yaga and a magical frog named Babushka-Lyagushka-Skakushka ("Grandmother Hopping Frog").

In a tale collected in the White Sea region from Russian storyteller Matvei M. Korguev with the title "Ондрей-стрелец" ("Ondrey, the Archer"), Ondrey is a member of the royal archers, and one day decides to go alone on a hunt. He shoots a female falcon (Russian: соколица, "sokolitsa") with an arrow and goes to kill it, but the falcon, with human voice, pleads for its life and asks to be taken to his home. He does and the falcon becomes a human maiden. They live as man and wife for some time. Months into their domestic arrangement, the falcon maiden wants to help her human husband improve is material wealth, so she weaves for him a carpet, and tells him to sell by the nighest price. The prince's servant buys it a hangs on a castle wall. The prince admires the handwork and asks about its origins. The servant says Ondrey's wife did it. They go to Ondrey's hut and his wife opens the door. They admire her great beauty, and, after returning to the palace, plot to kill Ondrey and take the maiden. Thus, the prince, advised by a witch, sends Ondrey on dangerous errands: first, to get a golden sheep's head from Buyan; then a golden pig hair; lastly, to go "don't know where", fetch "don't know what". The falcon maiden, named Elena the Beautiful, summons magical help to produce the golden sheep's head and the pig hair. As for the "don't know whay", Elena gives her husband a yarn he must roll out and follow the thread where it ends. With tears in his eyes, he says goodbye to his wife and follows the ball of yarn. It stops at a castle, where his wife's family lives. With the help of his mother-in-law, a wise sorceress, he locates the "don't know what": a spirit named Svat Naum.

==== Kalmyk people ====
According to Baira Goryaeva, expert on Kalmyk folklore, tale type 465A, in the Kalmyk tale corpus, shows that the hero (of humble origins) marries a daughter of Khurmusta-Tengri, a celestial deity.

In a Kalmyk tale, Tsarkin Khan and the Archer, an Archer steals the robe of a "golden-crowned" swan maiden when she was in human form and marries her. Later, the titular Tsarkin Khan wants to marry the Archer's swan maiden wife and plans to get rid of him by setting dangerous tasks.

==== Gagauz people ====
In a tale from the Gagauz people, Concerning the Sun, collected by Moshkov and translated by Charles Fillingham Coxwell, a tsar orders his three sons to shoot three arrows to decide their fates. The elders' arrows land near human maidens; the youngest's falls nears a tortoise. The tsar's son takes the tortoise home and goes hunting. When he returns at night, he sees the place clean and tidy and a meal prepared for him. He discovers that the tortoise changes into a beautiful human maiden and gets rid of her shell. Some time later, his father, the tsar, sees his daughter-in-law and decides to have her for himself. So he goes to his son and tasks him with getting his dead mother (the tsar's dead wife)'s ring, by going into the other world. The magical wife, now human, instructs her human husband to go to the sea and shout into a hole, her mother will appear and give him the keys to the earth. The tsar's son obeys his wife and uses the keys on the locks of the earth; the enters the earth and begins a journey. Every stop he is asked by a person about a problem, and the tsar's son promises to bring the questions to God (tale type ATU 461, "Three Hairs from the Devil's Beard"). He reaches a shining castle, and meets the mother of the Sun, who tells him that the Sun has his mother's ring. Coxwell compared the initial episode to the Russian tale Frog Princess and German (Grimm) tale The Three Feathers.

==== Georgia ====
According to Georgian scholarship, tale type ATU 402, "The Frog as Bride", is "contaminated" with (former) tale type AaTh 465C, "Beautiful Wife (The Journey to the Other World)": the task the hero's rival sets him is to visit Hell (Other World) in search of something (a soul of a deceased person, an object).

In a Georgian tale, The Frog's Skin, three brothers try their luck in finding a bride by shooting three arrows at random locations. The third brother's arrow falls near a lake; a frog jumps out of it and he takes it home. His elder brothers find human girls as brides, whereas he has to remain with a frog, but such is his fate. One day, after he returns from work, he sees that the house has been swept and cleaned up. He decides to discover who is this mysterious housekeeper: he hides one day and sees that the frog casts off its amphibian skin to become a human maiden. The man takes skin to burn it. Despite his frog-wife's protests, he does it anyway. Some time later, news reach the ears of the lord of the country of the man's beautiful wife. Hellbent on earning her as his wife, the lord threatens the man with nearly impossible tasks or death. His wife reminds him of her warning, but gives him the means to save himself: he should go to the edge of the lake where he found her and summon for Mother and Father. The last task is to go to the Other World in search of the lord's mother and get from her a ring.

In a Georgian tale translated by Caucasologist Heinz Fähnrich with the title Die Tochter der Sonne ("The Daughter of the Sun"), three friends work together in the fields. One of them loses his harvest and leaves to look for work elsewhere. He works for a rich man and promises to collect all the hay in one day. He almost fulfills his promise, until he sees the Sun and begs it not to set until he has finished the last one. The sun sets and night comes; the man loses his work and goes to another employer, where he works as a shepherd. A wolf comes and takes a sheep to the woods. The man follows the wolf and rests a bit near a river. He then sees three Sun maidens descending from the sky to bathe in a lake. The man takes one of the Sun maidens to his poor hut and marries her. The Sun maiden gives him a magical ring. Some time later, the poor man wants to invite the monarch to see his humble house, but his wife warns against it. He invites the king, who sends his nazirs and viziers in his stead. The nazirs and viziers go the man's hut and see the Sun maiden. They report back to the king that a beautiful maiden is married to a poor man, when she is fit to be a king's wife. The king then sends the poor man to get the golden ram of the Sun. The man goes to his father-in-law and gets the ram. Next, the king orders the man to go to the Afterlife to retrieve the king's mother's ring. His wife gives him an apple and tells him to follow it wherever it rolls. The man follows the apple and finds a deer with giant antlers, an emaciated bull and a priest carrying a church on his back who ask him the answers for their problems. He also meets a strange couple, a woman building a tower with eggs, a baker who burns bread in an oven, and they explain they are being punished for misdeeds in their lives.

==== Greece ====
According to Marilena Papachristophorou, Greek scholar Georgios A. Megas supposed that the Greek oikotype (the animal wife as a turtle and the human husband as a fisherman) originated from an Oriental source.

Author Barbara Ker Wilson translated a Greek tale with the title The Tortoise-Wife. In this tale, a poor fisherman named Elias catches a sea tortoise and brings it home. When he is away, the sea tortoise becomes a human maiden, does the chores and prepares the food, then goes back to being a tortoise again. One day, Elias discovers the tortoise maiden and wants to make her his wife. She consents to their marriage, but begs him not to burn the tortoise shell, lest future trouble befalls them. Despite her warnings, Elias burns the tortoise shell, so the maiden remains human at all times. Some time later, the king discovers the fisherman's beautiful wife and summons him to his court. Elias is given difficult tasks by the king, which he accomplishes with the help of his wife's sea tortoise mother.

==== Armenia ====
In a 1991 article, researcher Suzanna A. Gullakian noted a similar combination between tale types 402, "The Frog Bride", and 465, "The Man persecuted because of his Beautiful Wife", in Armenia. She also argued that this combination was "stable" and "part of the Armenian tale corpus", with at least 8 variants recorded.

=== Asia ===
==== Turkey ====
A similar story is attested in the Typen türkischer Volksmärchen ("Turkish Folktale Catalogue"), devised by scholars Wolfram Eberhard and Pertev Naili Boratav. According to their system, abbreviated as TTV, EbBo or EB, in type TTV 86, Das Frosch-Mädchen ("The Frog-Maiden"), three princes try their luck in finding brides by throwing three arrows at random, the youngest prince's falls near a frog whom he marries; the frog bride's skin is burnt by the prince, and she remains human; due to this, the king, her father-in-law, begins to lust after her, and devises ways to kill his own son, by sending him on a quest for impossible things. According to Eberhard and Wolfram's system, the supernatural bride appears as a frog in most of the catalogued variants, followed by a turtle, and a rat or a dog in others. In other variants, the fairy maiden (a peri) comes out of a piece of wood the male character (named Mehmet Efendi) takes home.

In a Turkish tale published by Ignác Kúnos with the title The Fish-Peri, a young, poor fisherman catches a fish so beautiful it saddens him to sell it or cook it, so he decides to keep it in a well. The next day, after he returns from his fishing trip at night, he sees the place neat and tidy, and wonders who could have done it. He spies on the person responsible for it, and sees that the fish has become a beautiful maiden. The youth takes the fish skin and throws it in the fire. The fish maiden consents to become his wife. However, news of her beauty reach the ears of the Padishah, who begins to lust after the maiden, and sets the fisherman on three difficult quests: to build a palace of gold and diamond in the middle of the sea in 40 days; to prepare a feast so grand everyone would eat and there would still be much food left; to have a mule hatch out of an egg, and to find a year-old infant who could talk and walk.

==== Middle East ====
In the Arabian Nights collection, the tale of Prince Ahmad and the Fairy Peri Banu is also classified as belonging to the tale type. Preceded by tale type ATU 653A, "The Rarest Thing in the World", the story continues as Prince Ahmad marries the Peri Banou, the daughter of the king of the jinni. The prince, after a while, visits his father, who becomes enamoured by his daughter-in-law.

==== Central Asia ====
In a Tuvan tale, Ösküs-ool and the Daughter of Kurbustu-Khan, poor orphan boy Ösküs-ool seeks employment with powerful khans. He is tasked with harvesting their fields before the sun sets, of before the moon sets. Nearly finishing both chores, the boy pleads to the moon and the sun to not set for a little longer, but time passes. The respective khans think he never finished the job, berate and whip him. Some time later, while living on his own, the daughter of Khurbustu-khan comes from the upper world in the form of a swan. The boy hides her clothing and she marries him, now that she is stranded on Earth. Some time later, an evil Karaty-khan demands that the youth produces a palace of glass and an invincible army of iron men for him - feats that he accomplishes thanks to his wife's advice and with help from his wife's relatives.

==== Korea ====
In a Korean tale, The Snail Woman, a poor farmer laments his solitude, but a woman's voice asks him to live with her. The youth sees no one but a tiny snail that he brings home. During the day, he toils in the rice fields, while the snail becomes a woman, does the chores and returns to the shell. The youth returns at night and amazes at the cleanliness of the place. He decides to discover who is responsible. On the third day, he sees that the snail becomes a human woman. He stops her before she returns to the shell. The snail woman reveals she is the daughter of the Dragon King, enchanted to be a mollusk. The enchantment is over and they live as husband and wife. A wealthy magistrate sees the woman and becomes enamoured. He decides to force the farmer to perform difficult tasks. The Dragon King's daughter says her father will help him. (Note: This Korean tale was classified both as type 402, "The Animal Bride", and type 465, "Man Persecuted because of his beautiful wife".)

==== Japan ====
The tale type 465 is also registered in Japan, with the name Tono no Nandai. Scholar Hiroko Ikeda reported 28 variants. Seki Keigo reported 39 variants, and noted its popularity in Japanese oral tradition.

In his system of Japanese folktales, Seki Keigo indexed a second type related to the story, which he titled The Flute-player Bridegroom. In this cycle, a woman from the world above descends to earth and marries a human flute player, because she enjoys his flute playing. A local feudal lord imposes three tasks on the flute-player, otherwise he must surrender his wife to the feudal lord. After they deal with the lord's advances, the tale segues into the human's visit to his wife's home.

==== Khmu people ====
Another variant, titled The Orphan and the Sky Maidens, was collected from the Kammu people of Southeast Asia.

==== Buryat people ====
In a Buryat tale, "Молодец и его жена-лебедь" (Mongolian: "Сагаан шубуугаар haмга хэhэн хубуун"; English: Molodets and his Swan-Wife), a down-on-his-luck boy tries to get a job herding horses in the steppes, lumbering for an old man and even planting crops, but no such luck. He decides to earn his living by fishing in a lake. And thus he spends his days. One day, he sees seven white birds coming down to the lake shore and decides to follow them. He sees they transforming into seven maidens. He hides and fetches the clothing of one of them, who gets left behind and the other depart. The bird-girl calls for the stranger: if a young man, she'll be his wife; if an old man, she'll be his daughter. The youth reveals himself, returns the birdskin, and they marry. One day, the bird maiden draws her portrait on a piece of paper that the wind blows away for seven days and seven nights, until the portrait lands on the lap of Abahai-khan, who falls madly in love with the maiden depicted and goes on a frantic search for her. He and his ministers discover she is the wife of the poor youth who lives near the lake. The Khan tries to send the poor youth on perilous quests to get rid of him, but, with his wife's help, he prevails and becomes the next khan.

=== Africa ===
==== Egypt ====
Scholar Hasan El-Shamy cited that the tale Histoire du pêcheur et de son fils ("The Story of the Fisherman and his Son"), collected by Guillaume Spitta-Bey in late-19th century, showed "the undisputable typological character" of type 465. In this tale, the king falls in love with the wife of a fisherman and conspires with his vizier to send him on dangerous quests.

==== Sudan ====
In a Sudanese tale, The fisherman and the prince, a humble fisherman catches a fish, brings to his hut and goes to the market. When he returns, he sees a great palace and a beautiful maiden, who reveals she was the fish, enchanted into that form. They marry. One day, the maiden bathes in the river and draws the attention of a local prince. The prince tries to create impossible riddles for the fisherman, but he answers it with his wife's help. This tale was also classified by scholar Hasan El-Shamy under type 465.

German ethnologue Leo Frobenius collected a tale from Kordofan with the title Das Girdamädchen ("The Monkey Girl"): an emir gives a spear to each of his three sons. The three sons throw their spears and kill three antelopes. The emir is satisfied and takes his sons through the village, where they are to cast their spears in front of the house with their respective brides. The elder two stick their spears in front of huts of human wives. The youngest bemoans the fact that there is not a beautiful young woman in their village and states he will try his luck in the desert. The youngest throws his spear and it hits a single tree with a Girda (a kind of monkey) on top of it. He takes the Girda home. The emir visits his human daughters-in-law to see their work and looks content with their choices. After he announces he will visit his third son, the youth complains to his wife that she is an animal, and she offers to finds him a good human spouse by directing him to a village in the desert. The youth thanks her help, but he is her husband, after all. That same night, he spies on his wife's room and notices a light shining out of it. The next day, the emir visits his son and marvels at the wonderful woven carpets and the exquisite food, and invites his three sons and their wives to his palace. The third son bemoans again his luck, but his monkey wife insists to be brought to her father-in-law's court. The third son sees that his monkey wife takes of the animal skin and he burns it. The now human wife decides to wear a veil to the banquet, and begs her husband to not let her lift her veil. Once there, she asks for some bread, and her veil is lifted. The emir admires his third daughter-in-law and decides to have her for himself and kill his son. Some time later, the emir orders his son to plant a vineyard overnight, to plant an orchard full of watermelons, to eat bread and meat that fill up a house, and to find him a child born overnight that can talk and walk.

== Cultural references ==
In modern Russian, the phrase Poydi tuda, ne znayu kuda, prinesi to, ne znayu chto (Russian: Пойди туда, не знаю куда, принеси то, не знаю что - Go I Know Not Whither and Fetch I Know Not What) refers (usually with irony) to a poorly defined or impossible task.

=== In film ===
The "Go There, Don't Know Where" is a 1966 feature-length cutout-animated film from the Soviet Union. It was directed by the "Patriarch of Soviet animation", Ivan Ivanov-Vano, at the Soyuzmultfilm studio.

=== In literature ===
The satirical poem "The Tale of Fedot the Strelets" by Leonid Filatov, written in early 1985, is based on the tale's storyline. An earlier, although less known story has been written by Vladimir Dal, called "The story of Ivan the young sergeant".

In Swedish author Maria Gripe's novel Agnes Cecilia - en sällsam historia, a copy of Narodnye russkie skazki repeatedly falls from its shelf, opening to the page containing the phrase.
