= The Golden-Headed Fish =

Armenian fairy tale

The Golden-Headed Fish is an Armenian fairy tale. It was first collected by ethnologist and clergyman Karekin Servantsians (Garegin Sruandzteants'; Bishop Sirwantzdiants) in Hamov-Hotov (1884) with the title ԱԼԹՈՒՆ ԲԱՇ ԲԱԼԸՂ ("Alt'un Bash Balygh").

The tale is classified in the international Aarne-Thompson-Uther Index as type ATU 507B, part of the cycle of The Grateful Dead. Variants are located in Armenia and other Caucasian countries, as well as in Southern Europe, the Middle East and in Turkey.

== Translations ==
The tale was later translated to English by A. G. Seklemian, and to French as Le poisson à tête d'or by Frédéric Macler. Andrew Lang included it in The Olive Fairy Book. Isidor Levin and Uku Masing republished the tale in German as Der Goldkopffisch.

== Synopsis ==
A king was going blind. A traveller said that if a golden-headed fish, found in the Great Sea, was brought to him within a hundred days, he would prepare an ointment from its blood to save the king's sight, but he had to leave in a hundred days. The prince took men and fished for it. He finally caught it, too late to bring it back. He intended to bring it back to show his father what he had done, and decided not to, because the doctors would try to make the ointment and so kill the fish uselessly.

The king refused to believe that the prince had tried, and ordered his execution. Servants warned the queen who gave her son common clothing and gold and sent him off to a distant island with a warning to take no man in his service who wanted to be paid every month. At the island, he bought a house and rejected many servants, who wanted to be paid by the month, and finally took on an Arab who wished to be paid every year.

On this island, a monster left half of it a wasteland, and whoever went to fight it fell asleep. The Arab asked the governor what he would give for killing it, and the governor offered half the land and his daughter; the Arab asked instead that he share whatever he gained. The governor agreed. The Arab killed the monster and told the prince to take the credit. The governor gave him a ship at his request, and secretly filled it with jewels.

They sailed to a far country. The Arab urged the prince to ask the king for his daughter. The king warned the prince that she had been married one hundred and ninety times, and all the bridegrooms had not lived out twelve hours, but the Arab urged him to marry her anyway. They were married, but at night, he saw men digging a grave for him. Then a small black snake wiggled into the bridal chamber, but the Arab saw it and killed it. After that, the princess lived happily with her new husband.

One day, he was summoned home with the news that his father was dead. He succeeded his father as king. One day, the Arab told him he had been summoned home and must leave him. The new king wished to reward him, because he had saved his life, but the Arab refused all, because he was the Golden-Headed Fish.

== Variants ==
=== Europe ===
Eberhard and Boratav reported at least one variant from the Kalmyks collected by Gustaf John Ramstedt.

==== Caucasus Region ====
According to Isidor Levin and Uku Masing, there are about 10 variants registered with the "fish helper" in the Caucasus Region.

===== Armenia =====
In a 1991 article, researcher Suzanna A. Gullakian noted the fish appears as the helper in Armenian tales of The Grateful Dead. According to Gullakian, in the "more common" version, totalling 10 variants, the prince has to find a fish to cure his father's blindness. In a later article by Armenian scholar Tamar Hayrapetyan, 22 variants of the tale of a talking fish have been recorded, with two alternate openings: the hero is either the son of a fisherman, or a king's son; in the latter, he releases the fish that could have saved the king.

In another Armenian variant, titled Ոսկե ձուկը (Voske dzuky; English: "Golden-Fish"), the prince is schooled for years and learns his father is going blind. A foreign doctor explains that the only cure is the blood of the golden fish. The prince sets to capture him. Once he fishes the animal, he spares its life and returns it to the sea. The king is furious and banishes his son. The prince, now a beggar, meets a mysterious Arab in his travels and they both agree to journey together. After a series of adventures, including an episode of pretending to divide the prince's newly married wife, (Note: This motif is commonly found in the series of folktales known as The Grateful Dead, a tale classified in the Aarne-Thompson-Uther Index as type ATU 505, "The Grateful Dead", and correlates.) the Arab reveals himself to be the very Golden Fish the prince spared once.

===== Azerbaijan =====
Azerbaijani scholarship registers a similar tale in the Azerbaijani Tale Corpus, indexed as 507C, Xeyirxah ölü ("The Good Dead"): either the hero ransoms a debtor's corpse from the creditors by paying the dead man's debts, or the king's father gives a snake some water to drink; the hero meets a mysterious helper (the dead man or the snake in human form), and both strike a friendship; they reach a kingdom where a princess is suffering from a strange illness or has killed many suitors at night; after winning the princess for his friend, the hero's companion offers to cut up the girl in two pieces, which causes her to release a snake from her body.

In an Azeri tale titled "Золотой подсвечник" ("The Golden Candlestick"), a shah is going blind and the only cure indicated by his new doctor is the blood from a speckled fish that lives in the White Sea. The shah's son mounts an expedition with fishermen and goes to the White Sea to find the fish. They catch the speckled fish and the prince is ready to strike it down, but the fish, with human voice, begs to be spared. The prince releases it back into the water and threatens his crew into silence. They return to the kingdom empty-handed. Later, an informant alerts the shah about the prince's deed and the shah, feeling betrayed by his own son, banishes him from the kingdom. The prince wanders to the White Sea and meets a companion. They become friends and agree to divide every earning equally between them. heu reach a kingdom where a princess lives who lost her voice. The king allows anyone who claims to be able to cure her, but kills those that fail. The prince and his companion promise to cure her. The companion enters the princess's room and tells a story to the princess's golden candlestick: a carpenter, a weaver and a doctor enter the forest; the carpenter carves a woman out of wood; the weaver dresses the wooden image and the doctor vivifies it - to whom does she belong? The companion asks the candlestick, but the princess answers for it. Her father rewards the companion with her hand in marriage, but he declines and lets the prince marry her. The companion leads the prince and the princess to the White Sea and reveals he was the speckled fish, son of the ruler of all the fishes. He cuts his finger and drops some of his blood in a cup to give to the prince's father as remedy, turns into a fish and returns to the sea. The tale was also translated to German language with the title Der wundersame Kerzenleuchter ("The Miraculous Candlestick").

===== Georgia =====
Georgian scholarship registers variants of the fish as the helper as the Georgian type 507, "Grateful Dead". In these tales, the hero releases "a blue fish" that helps him to discover the princess's deadly secret and purifies her.

Author Marjory Wardrop collected a Georgian variant titled Gulambara and Sulambara. In this tale, the only cure for the king's blindness is "a fish red as blood", which can only be found in a distant sea. A fisherman captures the fish and brings it to the king. One day, the prince sees the fish in a basin and, feeling great remorse at its killing, decides to release the fish back to the water. The king learns of this and banishes his son. Wandering about, the boy reaches a stream, when he sees another boy of the same age and they decide to be brothers. When they reach a city, the mysterious boy warns the prince to stay indoors while he earns their living. He leaves their house one day and, walking around town, sees a tower and a row of spiked heads. The prince asks what is the meaning of such a sight, and he learns that the heads are from suitors who have failed to answer the princess's riddle: "Who are Gulambara and Sulambara?". The prince knows Gulambara and Sulambara are names of flowers, but he is given a chance to answer correctly. After a series of adventures, he answers the princess's riddle and marries her. When the prince and the princess come across the stream, the mysterious boy appears and suggests they divide the maiden equally. The mysterious boy binds her to a tree and threatens to strike her with a sword, but - lo and behold! - a "green stream" flows from the maiden's mouth, and the boy explains that "she was venomous" and "it would have killed the prince". He then reveals he is the crimson fish, and gives the prince a handkerchief with the cure for the prince's father.

In the tale "Сын рыбака" ("The Fisherman's Son"), a fisherman sets his son to help him catch fish. One day, the son catches quite a netful of fish, and beats every last one of hem, but he sees a small red fish still alive and lets it be. The red fish thanks the boy for sparing his life and gives him one of his bones to summon the fish in case he needs any help. The son tells his fisherman father of the event, and the man beats and banishes his son. The boy asks his mother for a bit of food and leaves home. On the way, he meets another person and shares his food with him. They become companions and reach another kingdom. The princess of this kingdom has become mute for some reason and her father will marry her to whoever can reverse her condition. The mysterious companions tells two riddle-like tales to her and she responds. The king gives the pair his daughter and the boys leave. When they pass by a bridge, the fisherman's son notices the absence of his friend - who was, after all, the same red fish. The compiler related this tale to the Grateful Dead cycle (types ATU 507C and 508).

In another Georgian variant, ლურჯი თევზი (romanization: "Lurji Tevzi") translated as "Синяя рыба" and "Der blaue Fische" ("Blue Fish"), a king is losing his sight, his only remedy is a blue fish that must be caught and brushed against his eyes at dawn. The king's son, named Levan, offers to get this fish. He does, but, seeing the sorry state of the fish, trapped in a jar, decides to release it. When the king demands the fish be brought to him, the son flees the kingdom and meets a youth named Ramaz on the road. They visit a woman in another kingdom and she tells them of the princess's riddle. The pair goes to the royal court and are asked "Who are Sulambara and Gulambar?". Advised by the old woman, the duo travels afar to discover their answer and bring it to the princess. At the end of the tale, they divide their earning between them, and the pal becomes a blue fish. The Russian-language compiler also related it to the cycle of The Grateful Dead.

===== Mingrelian people =====
A similar tale, titled Der schöne Fisch (Mingrelian: Skwami čḫomi; English: "The Beautiful Fish"), was collected by ethnologist Robert Bleichsteiner from the Mingrelians.

===== Abkhazian people =====
In a tale from the Abkhazians, published by linguist Khukhut S. Bgazhba with the title "Царевич и золотая рыбка" ("The Prince and the Golden Fish"), a prince oversees his father's fishermen. One day, they capture a beautiful golden fish. Touched by its beauty, the prince decides to release it back to the sea. His father, the king, learns of this and banishes him from the kingdom. The prince meets a youth and they become friends. They reach a kingdom whose princess has married 300 times, and all of her suitors have mysteriously died. The prince decides to marry her, despite his friend's objections. During the night, while the couple is asleep, some snakes crawl out of the princess's mouth to kill the prince, but the companion wields his sabre and decapitates the snakes. The prince awakens, sees his friend in a battle stance, and misreads his intentions. The three leave the kingdom and stop by the place where the prince met his companion. The friend and the prince decide to divide the princess between themselves, and the bodies of the snakes come out of her mouth. The friend explains he saved his life in the princess's chamber, just as the prince has saved his once before, for he was the golden fish.

===== Tsakhur people =====
In a tale from the Tsakhur people collected by Adolf Dirr, Der rote Fisch ("The Red Fish"), a king has gone blind and the only cure is to catch a red fish in the White Sea, kill it and rub its blood on the king's eyes. The prince goes with a crew of fishermen to catch it, succeeding only on the third day. The prince captures the fish, but releases the animal, and makes the crew promise not to tell the king. However, a servant returns to the palace and reveals to the king, who expels his son from the kingdom. On his journeys, he meets a man and they travel to another kingdom, whose princess has become mute since she was seven years old. The prince's companion tells a story and asks a question, and the princess answers it, breaking her state. The princess is married to the prince. On the wedding night, a serpent crawls into the bedchambers and the mysterious companion kills it. The mysterious companion also disenchants the princess by making her vomit snakes, gives the prince the cure for his father and explains he was the red fish.

===== Tabasaran people =====
In a Tabasaran tale titled "Илясна гъизил балугъ", translated into Russian as "Ильяс и золотая рыбка" ("Ilyas and the Golden Fish"), Ilyas, the son of the padishah, is looking for a cure for his father's illness: a certain golden fish. He manages to catch one that has fish tail and human upper torso, but decides to release it back in the sea. The youth returns to his father, who expels him for some perceived treason, and Ilyas's mother gives her some food as provisions for the road and some pieces of advice: if her son meets a person in the road, shares an apple with him; if the person divides it unequally, they are not to be trusted, but if they share it equally between them, they can become friends. Ilyas meets a person on the road and they become friends, following his mother's advice. The pair then goes to another kingdom, where its padishah has a daughter that has not spoken for months. The pair decides to make her talk and break her muteness. Ilyas's friend then begins to tell stories with riddles to the princess, and, after three days, she regains her voice after answering them. The padishah thanks the pair and gives his daughter to Ilyas. Back on the road, Ilyas's friend tells the prince they must share everything between them, any rewards included. Ilyas's friend then poses to strike the princess with a sword, and the girl screams in terror. Suddenly, a djinn-demon in the shape of a snake comes out of her mouth, indicating she is freed from any evil influence. Ilyas's friend then explains the reason for his actions, and reveals he was the goldfish Ilyas released back into the sea. The goldfish gives Ilyas a potion to cure the padishah, and returns to the sea. A version of the tale was published as Ilyas, and sourced from Azerbaijan.

==== Greece ====
Richard MacGillivray Dawkins located Greek variants in Vourla, in Pontos and in Cyprus where the protagonist releases a fish that he caught as remedy for a sick person, and later the fish repays his kindness by becoming the protagonist's companion.

Professor Michael Merakles noted that in Greek variants of type 507C, "The Serpent Maiden", the hero is a fisherman's son who flees from home for releasing a fish, and meets a strange companion on the way (an incarnation of the fish). They go to another kingdom and try their luck to make the princess regain her voice by telling her a story-within-a-story about which suitor shall have for wife the princess they rescued (a tale type that Merakles proposed to add to the international catalogue as AaTh *852A).

Folklore scholars Anna Angelopoulou and Aigle Brouskou state that the character of the grateful fish appears twice as the grateful dead in Greek variants.

Author Lucy Mary Jane Garnett reported a Greek-language tale titled Story of the Golden Fish, wherein the titular golden fish returns as human to help the hero.

==== Bulgaria ====
In his Übersicht über einige Resultate der Märchenforschung, folklorist Kaarle Krohn reported at least one Bulgarian variant of this narrative: the prince releases back into the ocean a "beautiful fish" (the only cure for his father's illness); he is expelled from the kingdom and meets a companion on the way; both liberate a princess from a serpent; the companion reveals he is the fish.

The narrative exists in the Bulgarian Folktale Catalogue under the banner *507C*, "Благодарна риба" or "Der dankbare Fisch" ("The Grateful Fish"), related to the international type ATU 507, "The Monster's Bride".

==== Romania ====
In a Romanian tale translated into French as L’empereur des poissons ("The King of the Fishes"), a fisherman catches a fish with shining scales. His son sees the fish, which says he is the king of fishes and begs to be released into the water. The boy does. The next day, his father beats and scolds the boy. He leaves home and meets a dwarf-sized man who becomes his companion. With the help of the dwarf, the boy seizes the fortune of a dead boyard. Later, the boy and the dwarf work together to discover the secret of the princess, whose previous 99 suitors died in mysterious circumstances. The dwarf threatens the princess with a sword, making her vomit a snake and three snake eggs. Having helped the boy, the dwarf vanishes, for he was the same fish the boy released once.

==== Serbia ====
A Serbian variant was collected as early as 1862, with the title "Златна рибица", translated as Ein Goldfisch ("A Goldfish"). In this tale (summary provided by Vatroslav Jagić), the youngest of three sons catches a goldfish, but releases it. His father expels him from home and he meets a friend on the way. They reach a kingdom, disenchant a princess from the snakes that appear at night in her bedchambers to kill her suitors, and the friend reveals he was the goldfish.

==== Russia ====
The East Slavic Folktale Classification (Russian: СУС, romanized: SUS), last updated in 1979 by folklorist Lev Barag, registers a single Russian variant of a similar narrative, indexed as type SUS -507C*, "Рыба-Счастье" (English: "The Fortune-Fish"). In this type, the hero catches a fish that helps him to win the princess; the same fish exorcizes the princess from deadly serpents that killed her previous suitors. This entry is derived from tale "Иваново Счастье", collected and published by folklorist F. V. Tumilevich and sourced from the Nekrasov Cossacks.

=== Asia ===
==== Middle East ====
===== Turkey =====
According to scholar K. S. Shakryl, Turkish variants of type 507C contain the fish in human form as the helper. In addition, the Turkish Folktale Catalogue, by Wolfram Eberhard and Pertev Naili Boratav, attests both the "Grateful Fish" and "The Grateful Dead" as different, but related, tale types. In their catalogue, titled Typen Türkischer Volksmärchen ("TTV"), the cycle with the fish as the helper is named TTV 62, Der Dank des Fisches ("The Grateful Fish"), with 12 variants, and the one with the dead man's spirit as helper is titled TTV 63, Der dankbare Tote ("The Grateful Dead Man").

In a Turkish variant collected from teller Şücrü Darıcı, in Çorum Province, in 1964, and archived in the Uysal–Walker Archive of Turkish Oral Narrative with the title ‘What God May Neglect, the Fish Will Not Forget’, a padishah is going blind, and the royal doctors recommend fish a black fish, a trout, and the oil of its flesh be pressed against his eyes. The fishermen catch the fish, but the padish's son, seeing the fish's suffering, decides to release it back to the sea. The padishah is informed of this, considers it an act of treachery and orders his son to be hanged. His mother concurs with her husband, but gives her son some bread for food and some advice: her son will meet three men on the road; if one of them divides the bread equally between them, her son shall befriend him. It happens as such and the padishah's son befriends a Black Arab. They plant a tree to mark their friendship. They travel to another kingdom and open a law office. He begins writing petitions for the common man on his typewriter and draws the attention of the ruler of the city. The ruler orders him to stop his activities, but the boy and the Black Arab disobey him. The ruler seeks counsel with his viziers, who advise the ruler to marry the boy to his daughter, since she has married a few times and all her suitors dies some days after the wedding. The boy marries the ruler's daughter and, on the fourth and fifth night after the wedding, the Black Arab kills two serpents that crawled out of the wife's womb. After killing the snakes and a son is born to him, the boy and the Black Arab receive gifts from the ruler and depart back to the padishah's realm. They stop by the tree they planted, the Black Arab expels more snakes from the girl's mouth, and reveals he was the black fish.

===== Syria =====
In a Syrian tale translated as Fai il bene e gettalo in mare ("Do good, and cast it in the sea"), a poor fisherman and his son catch a very large fish, but they cannot lift it out of the sea. While the fisherman goes away to get help, the boy sees that the large fish has disappeared, in its place a small one, with a plea written to return it to the sea. The boy obeys the written command, but, fearing his father's wrath, escapes and find shelter in a cave. He also meets another boy, who claims to have fled home, since he disturbed his father (a painter)'s work. They strike a friendship and go to another city, where they find work with an innkeeper. They work for sometime, until the boy's companion goes to the king's castle, and sees a wall of skulls on spikes. A man explains that the king's daughter does not speak, and that the skulls belong to all who those failed in making her speak. The boy talks to the king and tries his luck. He places a bedsheet between and begins to tell her stories with a riddle: in the first, a carpenter, a tailor and a sheik each contribute to carve and animate a woman made of wood; in the second, two brothers mistakenly kill each other, their wives pray to Allah to restore them to life, but their heads were placed on each other's bodies; in the third, a woman wants to marry, but has three suitors to choose from, so he sets a challenge for them to find the rarest thing the world. The princess's voice returns and she marries the painter's son. He returns to the fisherman's son and gives him half of 40 camels, 40 chests of gold, and insists on dividing the princess. The painter's son prepares to strike her, but she screams for her life. Sensing that the princess finally regained her voice, the painter's son reveals he was the small fish that was cast back into the sea.

German linguist and Semitologist Gotthelf Bergsträsser published a Syrian tale from Ma'lula. In this tale, a poor fisherman laments his poor luck that he has not caught any fish, until one day he casts his net and gets a fish. However, he remembers a proverb about "doing good and cast it in the sea". So he releases the fish back into the water. The next day, he pulls from the sea a casket full of pearls. He shows his finding to his son, who suggests they go to Stambul to sell them. They depart for Stambul and meet another person in town, who joins the father-son duo. They sell the pearls and spend some time in the city. The local king has a daughter who has married ten times, and every suitor has died in mysterious circumstances. The fisherman's son begs his father to ask for the princess's hand in marriage, despite the danger. On the first two nights, the fisherman's son sleeps on the princess's bed, their new companion also in the bedroom. A snake comes out of the princess's mouth and coils around the fisherman's son's neck to strangle him, but the companion cuts off its head with a sword. One year later, the fisherman and his son begin to miss home and decide to return. The king gives them a dowry and sends them on their way. During the journey, their mysterious companion says they should divide all of their earnings, the princess included. He goes to strike her with a sword to divide her, and snakelings come out of her mouth. The companion tells them it was a trick by him to purify her from the snakes, as payment for the fisherman's kind deed back then. The fisherman, his son and the princess then go to the fisherman's house, and the fisherman tells his wife about their adventures and their companion, who went on his path.

===== Kurdish people =====
In a tale from the Kurdish people, Мирза-Мамуд ("Mirza-Mahmud"), Mirza-Mahmud is a youth who shares his food with the fishes of the sea. He decides to leave home and know the world. He meets another boy on the way, named Ahmed Khan, and both swear an oath towards each other, becoming blood brothers. One day, they reach a kingdom whose princess, Porsor-khanum, has lost the ability to speak. Her father, the king, promises her to anyone who can make her speak again. Mirza-Mahmud conspires with his companion to make the princess speak, by telling her a story-within-a-story, and asking her a riddle at the end of the narration. After the third story, Porsor-khanum regains her speech and departs with both youths. Midway in their journey, Ahmed Khan suggests they divide everything between them, including the princess. Ahmed Khan and Mirza Mahmud hit the princess and a snake comes out of her mouth. Ahmed Khan kills the serpent and reveals he is the son of the padishah of the sea, with whom Mirza Mahmud shared his food.

Kurdologists Ordîxanê Jalîl, Celîlê Celîl and Zine Jalil collected another Kurdish tale in 1972 from informant Morofe Mahmud, a native from Armenia. In this tale, titled "Сын рыбака" ("Son of the Fisherman"), a fisherman and his son catch a unique and beautiful fish. While his father goes to call some buyers, the fish pleads for his life and the boy releases it. The fisherman returns and, seeing the fish is missing, chastises his son. Later that day, the boy asks his mother to bake him three cakes, and she advices him to befriend only a stranger who divides equally the cake with him. The boy leaves home and meets two people on the road, who get he better portion of the cakes. The boy befriends another boy and they reach another kingdom, whose king's daughter is mute. The boy's companion goes to the king to announce he and his friend will make the princess speak, while many before them have failed and were killed. The boy, the companion and the princess spend three nights together, with the companion telling a story-within-a-story each night to get the princess to react. After three nights, the princess's voice is restored and she is given to both boys. They return to the road with the princess and the companion suggests they divide their gains, including the princess. The companion poises to strike the princess, and snakes come out of her - the source of her predicament. At last, the trio return to the fisherman's house, where the companion reveals he was the same fish and returns to the sea.

===== Israel =====
According to scholar Heda Jason, some Israeli variants of The Grateful Dead story (AaTh 506) replace the dead person for the fish, who assumes human form and helps the hero that released him back into the sea.

Orientalist Raphael Patai collected a tale from an Arab source living in Israel. In this tale, titled The Return of the Light, a king worries for the lack of an heir, and finds a remedy for his wife. The queen gets pregnant and gives birth to a boy. The young prince grows up and becomes an impulsive and reckless man, to the king's concern. The king's health deteriorates to such an extent he becomes blind, and the royal doctors prescribe the two golden hairs from "a famous fish in the sea". The prince (the emir) leads some seamen to the open sea and they catch the fish in a net. The seamen and the emir try to cut the golden hairs with their swords, to no avail, but their strikes cut open the net and the fish escapes back to the sea. After a month, the seamen cannot seem to find the fish again, and promise to rebel if the emir does not leave the kingdom. Against his own wishes, the emir leaves the kingdom, with provisions given by the queen, and an advice: to join with "eminent and virtuous people". The emir wanders for days and meets a person on the road. He agrees to share his food: he pretends to be asleep and places his saddle-bag near him; his companion grabs the food and eats to his own satisfaction. The emir says they must depart. In another city, the emir meets a Black man wielding a sword, who wishes to be the emir's companion. They later take shelter in a sand dune; the Black man stands guard and kills a venomous viper to protect the emir. The next day, they reach a land of shepherds who are being threatened by a giant. The emir and the Black man decide to fight the giant. They kill him and release a maiden named Nūr ("Light") and the shepherds from the giant's oppression. The Black man and the emir finally reach the emir's city after six months, and the Black man tells his friend he must depart back to his people, since he is a king. The emir begs for the Black man to stay with him, but the Black man is resolute. Before he leaves, however, the Black man gives the emir the fish's two golden hairs, and instructs him to wipe the king's eyes with them, then dives back into the sea. The emir heals his father's eyesight, marries Nūr and rules after him.

===== Iraq =====
In an Iraqi tale collected by Charles G. Campbell from a Muntafiq source, titled The Story of Hajji Ali, the great sultan, and his son, the Amir Kheyyun, a sultan named Hajji Ali has a brave son, Amir Kheyyun, who is fierce in battle and well-read. One day, the sultan summons his son and says he is getting old, and the boy must find himself a wife. The boy declines his father's request, since he has read many horrible things about women in sages' books. Despite the boy's refusal, the sultan proceeds with marriage preparations, and summons his entire court, the ministers and governors for a grand wedding celebration. Still, the boy utters a sonorous no to his father's face and in front of the assemblage. Enraged, the sultan orders his son to be imprisoned in a tower. One day, a local fisherman catches a beautiful goldfish and decides to gift it to the sultan's son to provide some company for the boy. It happens thus, and Amir Kheyyun receives the goldfish, preparing a pond for it. The little fish, however, does not like being trapped in a small pond, and splashes about. Amir Kheyyun, seeing the animal's reaction, decides to release it back into the water. He does that and the little fish, who the tale describes as really a female fish that can change into human form, goes to reunite with its mate, a male goldfish, and tells him where she has been. The male goldfish takes pity on Amir's plight and decides to help him find a wife, so he changes himself into a human dervish and goes to meet the prince on land. The fish-dervish goes to meet the prince in his secluded cell, and reveals the prince desires the girl named Aliya bent Rejab. Amir pleads with the dervish to help him get Aliya, and both escape on horses without the guards noticing, and ride to Aliya's palace. They reach the palace at night. Inside the palace, Amir sights Aliya on her bed and marvels at her, but takes her with him to the dervish, and they ride away. The next day, the dervish says they must divide the girl between them, as is custom, but Amir Kheyyun says it cannot be so. The dervish insists, despite the prince's words and Aliya's pleas, and poises to strike her in the middle, when the girl opens her mouth in fear and a snake's head appear inside it. The dervish recognizes the snake as "Zeboshun", and bids it come out. A large green snake leaves the girl's body and slithers to the desert, and the dervish explains the snake is of a rare breed that lodges itself in girls' and women's bodies to torment their husbands. His mission accomplished, the dervish bids his farewells to Amir, and leaves them be. Amir Kheyyun takes Aliya with him to his father's kingdom and marries her. In a review of the book, scholar Kurt Ranke classified the tale as tale type 507C.

==== Iran ====
Professor Ulrich Marzolph, in his Catalogue of Persian Folktales, listed three variants where the fish appears as the helper, all grouped under type 507C, Der dankbare Tote ("The grateful dead person"). In one from Esfahan and one from Husestan, the animal is a laughing fish, while the tale from Balučestān contains a red-coloured fish. He also established that Iranian tale type 507C corresponded to Turkish tale type 62, of the Typen Türkischer Volksmärchen.

Professor Mahomed-Nuri Osmanovich Osmanov translated to Russian and published an Iranian tale collected by A. Enjavi. In this tale, titled "Два товарища" ("Two Companions"), an old man is out looking for work, when a fisherman asks him to help him pull a net from the sea, since it caught something heavy. The old man agrees, while the fisherman goes to summon more people to help them. While the fisherman is away, a fish comes out of the sea, laughs at the old man's face, then dives into the water. The old man lets the net loose and releases the fish. The fisherman returns and, on noticing the old man failed in this task, sends him away. The old man wanders off until he meets a young man, who wishes to accompany him. They reach a city and spend a night in a caravanserai, wherein the youth introduces himself as Mota, while the old man says his name is Moti. Mota and Moti sell meat and earn their living. After a year, Mota tells Moti to beat the daroga drum at the king's palace's entry and say he can cure the princess's muteness. It happens thus, and the king sends for the duo. Mota asks the king to prepare a bed of flowers in the room, while the princess is standing behind a curtain. The flowers begin to speak and tell tales. The first story is about a vizier that promises his gardener that his daughter will enter the garden as soon as she marries; she marries a rich merchant, who agrees to let her fulfill her father's promise; on the road, she meets a band of robbers, who let her go after they learn of the reason for her wandering. The mute princess answers the flowers' question: the husband's act was more noble. The flowers then tell another story: three brothers and princes are in love with the same girl and find three presents for her (a rug, a mirror, and a cup of reiving water); the princess dies, and each contribute in reviving her; prompting the question whom she should be with. The mute princess answers that she should stay with the one that bought the mirror, for it was through the mirror the suitors learnt the girl was dying. The mute princess regains her speech, and Mota tells Moti to have the princess lie in her room for three nights. After the appointed time, the duo leave with the princess, when they stop in the middle of the road for Mota to divide their earning between them, the princess included. Mota goes to strike the princess with a sword, when a worm comes out of her mouth. Mota then explains the worm would have killed Moti, and reveals he was the same laughing fish the old man released back to the water.

In another Persian tale, "میرماهی و ابراهیم طبیب" ("Mirmahi and Ibrahim Tabib"), the king is dying, and the only cure for him is the blood of a legendary fish named Mirmahi, found in a distant land. The king's son, Ibrahim, travels afar and finds the fish, but decides to release it. He returns home to an angered king, who orders for his son's execution. The king's trusted guard, however, spares the prince's life and presents the king false proof of the youth's execution. The prince exiles himself and meets a dervish on the way. After some adventures, the dervish gives him a kerchief soaked with Mirmahi's blood to give to the king, for the dervish is Mirmahi, the very fish he spared once. The prince goes home, gives the kerchief to cure his father.

==== Pakistan ====
Scholar Mansel Longworth Dames collected a text in the Baluch language he titled Prince Nihāl and the Fish, which has also been translated to Russian language with the title "Царевич Нигал и рыба" ("Prince Nigal and the Fish"), and sourced from Pakistan. In this tale, a fisherman catches a large fish to gift the king, but prince Nigal buys the fish by 4 rupees and releases it in the sea. The king, his father, learns of this and exiles his son. On the road, Nigal is approached by a Baluchi youth on a white horse and they become friends. They reach another kingdom and find work as king's guards. One night, Nigal covers the first shift and sees a white-bearded man leaving the castle. The mysterious man explains he is the king's "fate", and that the king's fate is to die by a black snake's venom that same night. Nigal enters the king's chambers to kill the black snake before it kills the king. He succeeds, but a drop of venom squirts on the queen's face. The queen wakes up and sees Nigal close to her face. Feeling that Nigal did something to her, she orders his execution. Nigal's companion, the Baluchi, tries to stave off the execution by telling the king some moral tales: in the first, an eagle saves a monarch from drinking from a cup laced with snake venom, and is killed for its efforts; in the second, a parrot brings its master, the king, fruits from the tree of life and tells him to plant them, but a snake bites into the fruits and drips them with venom, and the king thinks that the parrot tried to kill him. The Baluchi tells the king to look under the bed: he finds the dead snakes. The king marries his daughter to Nigal, who leaves the kingdom with his wife and his companion. After they reach a point in the road, the Baluchi says it is time to divide their earnings, meaning the princess. When the Baluchi is poised to strike the girl, black snakes come out of her mouth. The Baluchi then reveals he was the fish that Prince Nigal bought back from the fisherman. The tale was also published in a Russian language compilation of stories from Balochistan.

In a Gawri (Kalam Kohistani) tale translated as The story of the unlucky prince and his friend, a king has two co-wives that quarrel with each other, and a son by the other wife. The king moves out one of the wives and her son to her own house, while he rules the kingdom with his other wife. The prince grows up and comes home to his mother. One day, the king falls ill and the royal doctors prescribe "a red kind of fish" as his only cure, which is to be caught, cooked and eaten. Many try to catch the fabled fish, to no avail. The prince is advised to find the fish and gain his father's favour: he places his hand under a stone and captures the fish to bring it to his father. The red fish begins to talk and begs the prince to be spared, calling him "friend". After seven steps, the prince decides to release the fish. The king learns his own son found and lost the fish, and banishes him from the kingdom as an act of mercy. The prince leaves the kingdom and meets a person on the road, who insists to become his friend, but the prince rejects his offer of friendship. Still, the stranger decides to accompany the prince. They stop to eat some food which the prince's mother prepared, but the man tosses the food to some dogs, saying that God's mercy will provide them with food. The stranger's words become true and God provides them with food, as they reach a city. The duo make a sleeping bed by the riverbank and spend time there. Later, the prince's friend says the prince can visit the six streets of the city, but not the seventh. Still, the prince disobeys his friend's warning and takes a trip through the seventh street: he sees the princess's face and faints. The prince then tells his friend he saw the princess, and his friend tells him to ring a bell to alert the local king he wants to have a go at courting the princess. The king learns the exiled prince and his friend are living by a hut in the river, and plots with his minister to get rid of the poor suitor: he must build a large house and a road connecting the king's palace and the house. The prince reports the task to his friend, who tells him not to worry, for God will provide them. The friend, who is a holy man, prays to God and the house is built overnight. The king then marries the princess to the exiled king, and the prince's friend leaves them be. Some time later, the prince decides to search for his friend, and plans to kill his wife for fear of people taking her, but she says she will cut off her hair to pass herself as another youth. They reach another kingdom where they find work, the prince with the local king, and the princess gives birth to a son. Later, in this new kingdom, some fairies talk to the exiled prince that their king needs a real prince's blood, and they have come to take the king's blood, but the prince offers his own son's blood to the fairies to spare the king. The princess agrees to let her husband kill their son and give the fairies his blood. The local king then goes to see on his servant friend and finds the princess died with grief for her son, and the exiled prince dies soon after. The king then asks for four graves to be dug up. Back to the prince's friend, who is a holy man, he learns his friend died and flies on his prayer mat to meet the king, advising people to wear clean clothes and gather for a collective prayer to God. It happens thus and the holy man revives the prince and his family, then reveals he was the fish the prince has caught once. The holy man then brings the prince's mother on his flying mat to live with him.

==== Central Asia ====
===== Kyrgyzstan =====
In a Kyrgyz tale translated into Hungarian with the title Az aranyhal ("The Golden Fish"), in a kingdom ruled by a khan named Bekjan, a fisherman catches a netful of fishes, a golden fish with them, and decides to show the khan. His son, Ismail, sees the golden fish and releases it back into the sea, putting a stone in its place. The khan sees the stone and admonishes the fisherman. The fisherman and his wife feel they will be hanged by the khan and tell their son to flee from the kingdom. Ismail's mother gives the boy some bread and some pieces of advice. The first advice is that, if Ismail shares his bread with a stranger and the stranger asks for the small share for himself, he is a good friend. The second advice is that Ismail should see if he can trust the stranger: he is to say he will relieve himself and leave the path; if the stranger is still there waiting for him, the stranger can be trusted. Ismail makes the test with a boy named Israjil and they become friends. They reach a city and beat some brigands. The king of the city summons them to his presence and announces he will pay them handsomely if they defeat a dragon who demanded the king's daughter, princess Gulamam, as sacrifice. They kill the dragon and Ismail marries Gulamam. They leave the kingdom with a large retinue and stop to rest by a water source. They pitch a tent for Ismail and the princess. At night, seven black pigeons (the souls of the dragon) perch near the tent and one of them plans to poison the princess with its beak; if one reveals the birds' plan will become stone. Israjil overhears the birds' language and touches the princess's face to remove the poison. Ismail wakes up to the strange scene before him and threatens his companion. Israjil reveals his intentions and becomes stone. Ismail restores him to life with the blood of a white pigeon. Lastly, Ismail and Israjil return to his kingdom and oust Bekjan Khan and enthrone Ismail as khan. Israjil and Ismail go near a lake and Israjil tells his companion they will divide everything, including princess Gulamam. Israjil prepares to strike her, when a dark cloud comes out of her breast. Israjil explains he cured the princess of evil influences and reveals he was the golden fish.

===== Turkmenistan =====
In a Turkmen tale collected from Mangyshlak Peninsula with the title "Золотой сазан" ("Golden Carp"), a fisherman and his son Tahir catch a golden carp. The man goes to summon the khan, while Tahir releases the fish back to the sea. The khan and his vizier come to see the golden carp and don't see the carp. Believing the fisherman tricked them, order Tahir to be cast adrift in the sea in a boat. His boat washes ashore on an island and Tahir is saved by a boy just like him. They learn that in this island lives a king whose daughter has never spoken. Tahir's companion offers to try his luck and divide his earnings with Tahir. The youth tells the princess a story, but she does not respond, so he threatens her with a sword and a snake comes out of her mouth. The princess begins to talk and gives him her ring. The youth goes back to Tahir to give him the princess's ring and reveals he was the golden carp, then dives back into the sea. Tahir takes the credit for restoring the princess and they marry. One day, Tahir, missing his father, goes to the beach and calls out to the golden carp. The golden carp tells it will summon a large fish to take them across the sea back to the fisherman's hut.

===== Uzbekistan =====
In an Uzbek tale translated into Russian language with the title "Золотая рыба" ("The Golden Fish"), an old fisherman lives near the beach. He fishes while his son plays an instrument and sings beautiful songs near the shore. One day, the boy's father catches a golden coloured fish and goes to tell the khan, expecting a fine reward for it. The boy, however, seeing the poor animal, releases him back into the ocean. When his father returns with the khan, they both scold the boy, tie his arms and legs, and place him a boat adrift in the ocean. The waves drive the boat to an island, where a mysterious boy appears and unties the fisherman's son. They become friends and explore the island. They see an old man, who tells them that their princess has spent the better part of her life in a speechless state. The duo takes their chances to heal the princess. The mysterious boy tells a silly riddle to the princess, who does not respond. He then threatens the princess with his sword, and a white snake comes out of her mouth, which the boy kills. The princess thanks him and gives him her ring. The mysterious boy returns to the fisherman's son, gives him the ring and reveals he is the golden fish he rescued. The fish-boy goes back to the sea, while the fisherman's son goes to the king to take the credit for the deed. The boy takes the princess and goes to the beach. He call out to the fish helper to give him a means of transportation to the other side of the ocean, and the fish summons a giant fish to help them get across.

In another Uzbek tale titled "Сахибджан и Ахмадджан" ("Sahibjan and Ahmadjan"), an old couple prays for a son, and thus one is born. They raise the boy, who helps his father in his fishing activity. One day, the boy is fishing with the net and captures a small fish. He decides to release the fish back into the ocean. A neighbour scolds the boy, who decides to leave home, with his parents' blessing. On the way, he meets another boy, named Ahmadjan, and they become friends. They find work in the building of a madrassa, and learn that a padishah wants to marry his daughter, but after her suitors pass through three trials. The boys decide to try their luck and beat the trials. However, Ahmadjan overhears the conversation of three ravens about the grim fate that shall befall the princess and her suitor, and decides to thwart them, even at the cost of his own life. He saves his companion and the princess, and becomes petrified (tale type ATU 516, "Faithful John"). A mysterious old man restores him, and the trio leave the kingdom. During the journey, Ahmadjan purges the princess of dragon's venom and reveals he was the small fish caught in the net.

In another Uzbek tale with the title "Побратимы" ("Blood Brothers"), the shah orders the fisherman to catch fish. At night, the vizier's son, Kasym, catches a fish with golden head and silver-scaled body, but releases him back into the sea. The shah learns of this and orders the boys execution. He is spared and exiled to the desert, where he meets another boy named Kalandar. Kalandar says he is the fish and wants to repay Kasym's kindness. Both companions go to another kingdom, whose princess was kidnapped by a dark div. They save the princess. On the journey back, as Kasym and the princess are sleeping, Kalandar sees a parrot come and spray poison on the princess's face, and tells Kalandar that if he tells anyone, he will turn to stone. Kalandar thwarts the parrot's plan and turns to stone. Kasym and the princess restore Kalandar to life. When they reach a river, Kalandar says his goodbyes and becomes a fish again.

==== East Asia ====
===== China =====
Chinese folklorist and scholar Ting Nai-tung established a second typological classification of Chinese folktales (the first was by scholar Wolfram Eberhard in the 1930s). In Ting's new system, he located one variant of type 507C, "The Serpent Maiden", published in 1957, wherein the hero's helper is a fish in human form who liberates the princess.

===== Uyghur people =====
In a Uyghur tale, The Golden Carp or A Golden Fish, a stepson returns a golden carp to the water. In a fury, his stepfather promises to kill the boy, but his mother warns him to run away. In his wanderings, he meets another boy and they become companions. The pair reaches another kingdom and eats without paying. Their sentences are commuted to finding a kidnapped princess. The boy and his companion find the princess and kill her captors, then the companion reveals he was the golden carp.

=== Africa ===
==== Egypt ====
Hasan El-Shamy collected an Egyptian tale in 1969 and published it in 1980 with the title The Grateful Fish. In this tale, Hasan, the son of a poor fisherman, catches a peculiar small fish and returns it to the water. His father scolds his son and expels him from home. On the road, the boy meets a dervish, who will help him marry the princess. At the end of the tale, the dervish reveals he was the fish.

== Analysis ==
=== Tale type ===
According to German folklorist Hans-Jörg Uther, the biblical story of the Book of Tobit resembles the Armenian tale quite closely. The story features a helper of supernatural origin (an angel in disguise), a hero (boy) on a quest for a remedy for his father, a maiden whose suitors/bridegrooms have died in mysterious circumstances in her bedchamber, and the exorcising of the evil spirits that possessed her. Accordingly, these plots can be classified in the Aarne-Thompson-Uther Index as tale types ATU 505, "The Grateful Dead"; ATU 551, "The Water of Life", and ATU 507, "The Monster's Bride", "The Poisoned Maiden" or "The Dangerous Bride" (the killer monster in the nuptial chamber).

Scholar Heda Jason attested the presence of variants in the Jewish Oriental tale corpus. She also classified the tale as type AaTh 506: a king's son (the hero) catches a fish, who later becomes his helper in getting a princess for wife. She also recognized that the biblical Book of Tobias contained a rewritten heroic fairy tale (AaTh 505).

Swedish folklorist Sven Liljeblad in his work about the tale type, tabulated two forms of the narrative: a type dubbed Asmodeus, wherein a dragon or serpent attacks the couple on the wedding night, and another named The Snake Maiden, wherein the snakes come out of the maiden's mouth. He also noted that in the former type the grateful fish introduction "occasionally" happened.

Armenian literary critic Hakob S. Khachatryan also noted the resemblance of the Armenian tale to subtype 507C, part of the cycle of The Grateful Dead.

=== The helpful fish ===
In his study on the "Grateful Dead" cycle of stories, American folklorist Gordon Hall Gerould related the presence of the fish in the Serbian tale to The Thankful Beasts motif, but otherwise the Serbian story "[had] all the characteristics of the [Grateful Dead] type".

Scholar Hasan El-Shamy considered an independent type he named 505A§, "Grateful for Being Spared: Animal (Bird, Fish) in Human Form as Helper", since, according to him, a grateful animal (fish or bird) "usually" appears as the hero's helper in Arab and Muslim cultures. He listed 21 variants of this category, found in Middle Eastern and North African sources.

Likewise, scholar Sven Liljeblad indexed the tales with the helpful fish instead of the dead person as Tobiasgeschichte (Typ-E) ("The Tale of Tobias - Type E").

==== Parallels ====
===== China =====
Richard McGillivray Dawkins suggested that the character of "the grateful fish" derived from Indian Buddhist literature. He claimed that in the book Monkey (a retelling of Chinese epic Journey to the West) a character named Kuangji catches a fish (a carp) as cure for a sick person, but releases it, and the fish reappears as a River Dragon King to help the hero. The Dragon King later reveals he was the carp. In another translation, the character, Guangrui, stays at the Ten Thousand Flowers Inn with his mother, who falls ill. Guangrui buys a golden carp to cook it for her, but he sees the fish "blinking vigorously" - a supernatural trait - and returns it to the sea.

A similar Buddhist account tells of Guanyin, the bodhisattva associated with compassion, who assumes the disguise of Miao Shan, buys a fish from fishermen and releases it, since the fish was the disguise of one of the sons of the Naga king. In gratitude, his father sends his daughter, Longnu, with a jewel or pearl to give to Guanyin. Sinologist Wilt L. Idema provided another version of this tale: instead of Guanyin, she sends her attendant Shancai to buy the fish (a carp), since the animal is indeed the third son of the Dragon King of the Eastern Ocean.

As reported by French missionary Henri Doré, in Chinese folklore the carp (li-yu) is the animal disguise of a marine deity (the Dragon King) or of a member of his court.

===== Korea =====
According to Korean scholarship, the carp is the animal disguise of a Dragon King (Yongwang) or a male relative. After he is saved, the Dragon King gives a handsome reward to the human character. Similar stories are attested in the Tale of Geotaji and the Tale of Jakgegeon.

===== Mesopotamia =====
Angelopoulou and Brouskou, on the other hand, suggest that the character of the grateful fish harks back to even older times, to the Apkallu of Mesopotamian myth and to a being named Oannes (Uanna), as described by later writer Berossus.

== See also ==
- Book of Tobit
- Fair Brow
- The Golden Bird
- The Tale of the Fisherman and the Fish
- The Wife from the Dragon Palace
