= The Tale of Fedot the Strelets =

1987 play poem by Leonid Filatov

The Tale of Fedot the Strelets (Russian: Сказка про Федота-стрельца, удалого молодца) is a play poem by Russian writer and actor Leonid Filatov, written in 1985 and first published in Yunost in 1987. With a storyline based on Russian folk tales, 'Fedot' is a social and political satire on contemporary realities of life in Russia. Characters mix archaic Russian language, typical for folklore, with neologisms of modern Russian, providing additional comic effect.

Film adaptations have been made in 1988, 2000 and 2008.

== Plot ==
The storyline is based on the folk tale Go I Know Not Whither and Fetch I Know Not What

Fedot, a strelets, serves at Tsar's court as the royal hunter. Tsar orders him to provide the game for his dinner with English ambassador. Fedot was unlucky: he got not a single bird. When he tried to shoot at least a dove, it turned into a beautiful maid, Marusya (Mary), who Fedot surprises him as his wife. Marusya, possessing magical skills, saves her man from Tsar's punishment: she summons Tit Kuzmich and Frol Fomich (two magical servants being a sort of genie, who could and would perform anything Marusya orders), and they fill Tsar's table with food.

The Tsar engages in diplomatic negotiations with an English noble, aiming to arrange a marriage with his daughter, the Princess, who lacks the beauty to attract suitors. The Princess and her nanny, an elderly and irritable woman, strongly oppose the match and argue against it, particularly with an ambassador they view as greedy and foolish.

After the dinner, the General, leader of the secret police, arrives to the Tsar. He tells his senior about Fedot's new beautiful wife, and Tsar begins to plan how to steal Marusya from Fedot. He orders General to find a task for Fedot which he would be impossible to complete and it would let Tsar to execute Fedot for incompetency.

General goes to the forest, where old witch Baba Yaga lives, and asks her advice. With her magic, Yaga finds the way. Tsar should order Fedot to bring him next day a magic carpet on which the whole Russia could be seen just like on a map. Tsar calls Fedot and orders him the carpet, Fedot feels low, but Marusia and her magic servants solve the problem and bring the carpet at morning.

Tsar, though trying to seem happy, is upset. He calls General again, threatening he will be punished if no plan will be given. General, also upset, goes back to Baba Yaga, who gives him another plan. Now Tsar orders Fedot to bring him next day a golden-horned deer, which is thought to not exist at all. But Marusia and her servants bring the deer as well.

Tsar forces General, General forces Yaga, and the final plan is prepared. The new task for Fedot is to find Something That Could Not Be in the World. Even Tit Kuzmich and Frol Fomich are unable to find a thing so loosely described. Fedot sets up to journey for his goal, leaving his young wife at home. A few days later, Tsar, despite being continually mocked by the Nanny for this, arrives with the wedding gifts to Marusya. The young woman refuses to betray Fedot for old and vile Tsar, she turns into a dove and flies away.

Fedot is wandering the world in quest for Something That Could Not Be. Shipwreck puts him on an uninhabited island. Its only master is a Voice, a bodyless yet powerful spirit, who is living a boring life: he can summon himself any good he wants, but the only thing he longs for is human company. Fedot, realizing he has found his goal, persuades the spirit to join him on his way back to the Russian Tsar.

Returning home, Fedot discovers his house devastated by Tsar, and Marusya tells him about Tsar's harassment. Fedot calls to the simple Russian people to help him avenge the injustice, and they rise up. The crowd storms into Tsar's palace. Tsar, General and Baba Yaga, caught in charge, each cowardly try to pass the buck to the two others. People sentence them to sail away in a bucket overseas. Then Fedot refuses a marriage offering from Princess, leaving her with his promise to find her another man, his twin. The tale ends up with the feast, supplied by Something-That-Could-Not-Be's magic.

== Characters ==
- Fedot, a strelets
- Marusya, his wife and magician
- Tsar of Russia
- Tsarevna, his daughter
- Nanny, an old sarcastic woman
- The General
- Baba Yaga, the old witch
- Something-That-Could-Not-Be, the bodyless spirit
- English ambassador
- Native ambassador
- Tit Kuzmich and Frol Fomich, Marusya's servants

== Adaptations ==
- In 1988, a 56-minute TV play ru:Про Федота-Стрельца, удалого молодца (телеспектакль) was made starring Leonid Filatov himself reciting the tale.
- In 2000, a live-action version Сказ про Федота-стрельца was filmed.
- An animated adaptation The Tale of Fedot the Strelets, the Daring Fellow by Melnitsa Animation Studio premiered on December 12, 2008 in Moscow. It has no official English title and has been referred to in the press by many different titles including variations of Fedot the Hunter, Fedot the Shooter and The Tale of Fedot the Archer.

== Bibliography ==
- Guseinova, I.A. and Brumfield, W.С. (2016), "Russian Folklore as a Poetics of Inference: (Based on Material from the Fairytale by Leonid Filatov "Fedot the Musketeer, a Brave Lad")" (PDF), Journal of Siberian Federal University. Humanities & Social Sciences, 9 (9): 2223–2230, doi:10.17516/1997-1370-2016-9-9-2223-2230, archived (PDF) from the original on 3 October 2016.
