= The Tale of Soldier Fedot, The Daring Fellow =

The Tale of Fedot the Strelets, the Daring Fellow
- Theatrical release poster
- Directed by: Ludmila Steblyanko; Roman Smorodin
- Screenplay by: Ludmila Steblyanko; Roman Smorodin
- Story by: Leonid Filatov
- Based on: The Tale of Fedot the Strelets by Leonid Filatov
- Produced by: Aleksandr Boyarsky; Sergey Selyanov; Konstantin Ernst
- Edited by: Sergey Glezin
- Music by: Maksim Koshevarov; Valentin Vasenkov
- Production companies: Melnitsa Animation Studio; CTB Film Company
- Release date: 14 December 2008
- Running time: 70 minutes
- Country: Russia
- Language: Russian

The Tale of Fedot the Strelets, the Daring Fellow (Russian: Про Федота-стрельца, удалого молодца, romanized: Pro Fedota-Streltsa, Udalogo Molodtsa) (Note: The title has been variously translated, including as The Tale of Soldier Fedot, The Daring Fellow; About Fedot the Shooter; The Tale of Fedot the Archer, Smart and Fast; The Tale of Fedot the Hunter, A Daring Fellow; About Fedot, the Shooter; The Tale of Fedot, the Shooter; Fedot the Shooter; Fedot the Musketeer, a Brave Lad; The Tale of Theodor the Archer; and About Fedot the Archer, a daring young man.) is a 2008 Russian animated film directed by Ludmila Steblyanko and Roman Smorodin. The plot is based on Leonid Filatov's play The Tale of Fedot the Strelets. It was first aired on Channel One on January 7, 2010.

== Cast ==
- Sergey Bezrukov as Fedot the Strelets (Russian: Федот-стрелец)
- Chulpan Khamatova as Marusya (Russian: Маруся)
- Viktor Sukhorukov as Tsar (Russian: Царь)
- Dmitri Dyuzhev as Colonel (Russian: Генерал)
- Konstantin Bronzit as Tit Kuzmich / Frol Kuzmich (Russian: Тит Кузьмич и Фрол Фомич)
- Mikhail Chernyak as English ambassador (Russian: аглицкий посол)
- Aleksandr Revva as Baba Yaga (Russian: Баба Яга)
- Yevgenia Dobrovolskaya as Princess's nanny (Russian: Нянька)
- Mikhail Yefremov as A disembodied voice ("Something-That-Can't-Be") (Russian: То-Чаво-На-Белом-Свете-Вообче-Не-Может-Быть)
- Irina Bezrukova as Princess (Russian: Царевна)
- Sergey Glezin, making sounds of "wild ambassador" (дикий посол)
- Oleg Kulikovich as narrator

== Reception ==
It was nominated for the Asia Pacific Screen Award for Best Animated Feature Film at the 3rd Asia Pacific Screen Awards in 2009. It was also nominated for Best Cartoon in the MTV Movie Awards in 2009.
