= Keigo Seki =

Japanese folklorist (1899–1990)

Keigo Seki (関 敬吾, Seki Keigo; 1899–1990) was a Japanese folklorist. He joined a group under Yanagita Kunio, but often came to different conclusions regarding the same folktales. Along with collecting and compiling folktales, Seki also arranged them into a series of categories.

This work culminated in his Nihon mukashibanashi shūsei (Collection of Japanese Folktales) (1928, revised 1961), in six volumes, which classified Japanese folktales after the model of the Aarne-Thompson system.

A selection was published as Nihon No Mukashi-Banashi (1956–7), and was translated into English as Folktales of Japan (1963) by Robert J. Adams.

Seki founded the Japanese Society for Folk Literature in 1977.

== University Life ==
Seki was a native of Nagasaki Prefecture and graduate of Toyo University. He studied philosophy and worked as a librarian for the university. He founded the Japanese Society for Folk Literature (Nihon Koshobungei Gakkai) in 1977 and was its first president. Seki understood German and translated two works of folktales from German to Japanese, Kaarle Krohn's Die folkloristische Arbeitsmethode (Folklore Methodology, 1926) and Aarne's Vergleichende Märchenforschung (Comparative Studies of Folklore, 1908).

== Research and Hypotheses ==
Keigo Seki's research was on how folklore came to Japan and if some folktales had been imported to Japan from countries such as India and China. Seki's second hypothesis was that folktales should be examined to understand their impact on ordinary events and are to help people in their daily lives. Seki also thought that there was a universal element to folktales and that they are not based on particular ethnic groups.

== Major works ==
- Nihon Mukashibanashi Shūsei (日本昔話集成; "Compilation of Japanese Folktales")
- Seki, Keigo, ed. (1963), Folktales of Japan, Robert J. Adams (tr.), University of Chicago Press, ISBN 9780226746159

== Categorization ==
In “Types of Japanese Folktales.” Asian Folklore Studies, vol. 25, 1966, Keigo Seki details his own categorization system for folktales, but it did not catch on and the Aarne-Thompson system prevailed. Seki's new categorization method was named “Nihon mukashibanashi no kata”. Seki's system had Japanese folktales divided into in the following 18 categories:

1. Origin of Animals
  - Folktales 1-30
2. Animal Tales
3. Man and Animal
  - Escape from Ogre
    - Folktales 31-74
  - Stupid Animals
    - Folktales 87-118
  - Grateful Animals
    - Folktales 119-132
4. Supernatural Wives and Husbands
  - Supernatural Husbands
    - Folktales 133-140
  - Supernatural Wives
    - Folktales 141-150
5. Supernatural Birth
  - Folktales 151-165
6. Man and Waterspirit
  - Folktales 166-170
7. Magic Objects
  - Folktales 171-182
8. Tales of Fate
  - Folktales 183-188
9. Human Marriage
  - Folktales 189-200
10. Acquisition of Riches
  - Folktales 201-209
11. Conflicts
  - Parent and Child
    - Folktales 210-223
  - Brothers (or Sisters)
    - Folktales 224-233
  - Neighbors
    - Folktales 234-262
12. The Clever Man
  - Folktales 254-262
13. Jokes
  - Folktales 263-308
14. Contests
  - Folktales 309-326
15. Osho and Kozo
  - Folktales 327-344
16. Lucky Accidents
  - Folktales 345-356
17. Fools and Numskulls
  - Fools
    - Folktales 357-385
  - Blunderers
    - Folktales 386-399
  - Village of Numskulls
    - Folktales 400-417
  - Foolish Son-in-Law
    - Folktales 418-441
  - Foolish Daughter-in-Law
    - Folktales 442-452
18. Formula Tales
  - Folktales 453-457
