= Wolfram Eberhard =

German academic (1909–1989)

Wolfram Eberhard (March 17, 1909 – August 15, 1989) was a professor of Sociology at the University of California, Berkeley focused on Western, Central and Eastern Asian societies.

== Biography ==
Born in Potsdam, German Empire, he had a strong family background of astrophysicists and astronomers.

He taught a wide variety of courses specializing in the societies and popular cultures of Western, Central and Eastern Asia. He was especially interested in Chinese folklore, popular literature, Turkish history, minorities and local cultures in China and the relations between the Chinese and the peoples of Central Asia. Eberhard entered Berlin University in 1927 where he focused his attention to classical Chinese and Social Anthropology. Because Berlin University, where Eberhard studied, did not offer instructions on colloquial Chinese, Eberhard enrolled secretly and simultaneously at the Seminar for Oriental Languages. At the Seminar for Oriental Languages he studied with Ferdinand Lessing. He enrolled secretly because at the time his professors at Berlin University, and teachers of classical Chinese did not approve of his interests in colloquial languages. Ironically, his teachers at the Seminar for Oriental Languages did not approve of his interests in classical Chinese. He received his diploma at the Seminar in 1929, and then worked for his long-time friend Lessing at the Berlin Anthropological Museum.

Eberhard made his first journey to China in 1934. After traveling through regions of China collecting folklore, studying temples and dissecting the Chinese culture. The purpose of the trip was to collect ethnographic objects for the Museum. In Zhejiang, Eberhard traveled in the countryside, studied temples, and collected folktales with the help of Ts'ao Sung-yeh 曹松叶 (1897-1978); most of these tales were published in Erzählungsgut aus Südost-China (1966). Then he went to Beijing and found work teaching German and Latin at Peking National University, Peiping Municipal University, and the Medical School at Baoding. Occasionally, his first wife Alide (née Roemer) coauthored with him and helped him with editing and translating into English. In 1934, his first son, Rainer, was born. The next year Eberhard travelled across northern China to Xi'an, the sacred mountain Mount Hua, Taiyuan, and the Yungang Grottoes at Datong. His interviews with Taoist priests on Hua-shan were the basis for the text of a book coauthored with Hedda Hammer Morrison, Hua Shun, the Taoist Sacred Mountain in West China (1974).

Eberhard returned to Germany from 1936 to 1937. In Germany, Eberhard became the director of the Asiatic section of the Grassi Museum in Leipzig during that time. However, Eberhard's stay in Germany would not last long. He was under heavy pressure to affiliate with the Nazis. Adam von Trott helped Eberhard obtain a Moses Mendelssohn Fellowship which enabled him to purchase a round-the-world ticket and received permission to leave Germany. While in Hong Kong he received the offer of a professorship at Ankara University. Even though he did not have the appropriate visas, he made his way by a circuitous route to Turkey where he was joined by his family. From 1937 to 1948, Eberhard taught history at Ankara. He taught in Turkish, and published in both Turkish and German on a wide variety of subjects, including Chinese folklore, popular literature, history, minorities and local cultures in China, the relations between the Chinese and the peoples of Central Asia, and Turkish history, society, and popular culture. Eberhard's tenure at Ankara contributed significantly to the development of sinological scholarship in Turkey. The first edition of his History of China, written in Turkish, was published in 1947. This was translated into German, English, and French; the fourth English edition was published in 1977.

Eberhard published an abundance of scholarship, including Kultur und Siedlung der Randvölker Chinas ("Culture and Settlement of the Marginal Peoples of China") in 1942 and his two-volume Lokalkulturen im alten China ("Local Cultures in Ancient China") in 1943. The publication of his Typen Chinesischer Volksmärchen ("Types of Chinese Folk Tales") was the framework that brought Chinese folklore into the study of world folklore. He also published many studies analyzing the content, structure and transmission of Chinese folktales and customs. Eberhard's sociological background influenced his research, as he was interested in not only the tale-teller but also the genders, ages and family relationships of tale-tellers and audiences. Eberhard died in his home in 1989.

== Works ==
For a fuller listing of works up to 1965, see Eberhard, Wolfram. "Bibliography of W. Eberhard's Works (1931-1965)". Settlement and Social Change in Asia. Collected Papers. Vol. 1. p. 439-463. Online at Internet Archive

=== Selected articles ===
- ---, "Chinese Regional Stereotypes," Asian Survey 5.12 (1965): 596-608.
- ---, and Frank Huang, "On Some Chinese Terms of Abuse," Asian Folklore Studies 27.1 (1968): 25-40.
- ---, "The Cultural Baggage of Chinese Emigrants: Stories and Novels Read by Chinese Students in Malaya," Asian Survey 11.5 (1971): 445-462.
- ---, "A Study of Ghost Stories from Taiwan and San Francisco," Asian Folklore Studies 30.2 (1971): 1-26.

=== Selected books ===
- A History of China (1969)
- Eberhard, Wolfram (1986) [1983]. Dictionary of Chinese Symbols: Hidden Symbols in Chinese Life and Thought. London and New York: Routledge. ISBN 0-415-00228-1.
- Folktales of China, edited by Wolfram Eberhard, The University of Chicago Press, 1968
- Typen chinesischer Volksmärchen, Helsinki, 1937
- Volksmärchen aus Südost-China, Sammlung Ts'ao Sung-yeh, Helsinki, 1941
- Guilt and Sin in Traditional China, 1967
- Wolfram Eberhard (1970). Studies in Chinese Folklore and Related Essays. Bloomington, Indiana University Research Center for the Language Sciences; [distributed by Humanities Press, New York]. ISBN 9780877501473.

== References and further reading ==
- Walravens, Hartmut (1990), "In Memoriam Wolfram Eberhard", Oriens Extremus, 33 (2): 3–10, JSTOR stable/24047283
