= Upon the Magic Roads =

- Theatrical release poster
- Directed by: Oleg Pogodin
- Screenplay by: Aleksey Borodachyov; Oleg Pogodin
- Story by: Pyotr Yershov
- Based on: The Humpbacked Horse by Pyotr Yershov
- Produced by: Anton Zlatopolskiy (ru); Sergey Selyanov (ru); Aleksandr Gorokhov; Natalya Smirnova
- Starring: Anton Shagin; Pavel Derevyanko; Paulina Andreeva; Mikhail Yefremov; Yan Tsapnik; Oleg Taktarov; Lyasan Utiasheva; Aleksandr Semchev
- Cinematography: Vladimir Bashta (ru)
- Edited by: Serik Beiseu
- Music by: Ivan Burlyaev; Dmitry Noskov; Konstantin Kupriyanov; Aleksandr Shevchenko
- Production companies: CTB Film Company; Russia-1; CGF Company; Supported by Cinema Fund
- Distributed by: Columbia Pictures (through Sony Pictures Releasing International) at Russia
- Release date: February 18, 2021 (Russia)
- Running time: 111 minutes
- Country: Russia
- Language: Russian
- Budget: ₽600 million; $7.7 million
- Box office: ₽1.176 billion; ~$19 million

Upon the Magic Roads is a 2021 Russian live-action/animated fairy tale fantasy film directed by Oleg Pogodin from a screenplay by Aleksey Borodachyov. Produced by CTB Film Company, Russia-1, and CGF Company, the film is an adaptation of the 1850s Russian fairy tale The Little Humpbacked Horse by Pyotr Pavlovich Yershov as well as elements from Slavic folk tales. The film follows other adaptations of the fairy tale including the 1941 live-action feature-length film and the 1947 animated film of the same name filmed in the Soviet Union. The film stars Anton Shagin as Ivan the Fool, and Paulina Andreeva as the Tsar Maiden with the voices of Pavel Derevyanko, Lyasan Utiasheva, and Aleksandr Semchev.

The principal photography took place near Saint Petersburg in 2018. The set pieces tried to recreate the fantasy world by Yershov, filming in an exact copy of the fairy tale city. The film was a film making exhibition requiring professional assistance from costume designers and set designers, a production team, software engineers with background visual effects, actors, actresses and cameramen.

The style used in the film was intended to recreate the Tsarist period of time described in Yershov's fairy tale, using a combination of Russian Art Nouveau and fairy-tale elements. The film tells about John - who is neither a prince, nor a hero, nor a handsome man, but his older brothers even consider him a fool. But everything changes when John has a friend and faithful assistant - the Little Humpbacked Magic Foal. John and the Foal will have to test their friendship, face an insidious adversary and overcome incredible trials to find the Cloud Princess.

Initially, the film was planned to be released on wide screen on 5 March 2020, but later its release was postponed first to 22 October 2020. Upon the Magic Roads was finally released theatrically on February 18, 2021, in Russia by Sony Pictures Productions and Releasing. The film received critical acclaim and commercial acclaim, with critics calling it an extraordinary continuity of cinematic creativity from past to present. The film became a blockbuster and was noted as the highest-grossing film adaptation of Russian literature, amounting to almost a billion rubles. The film is the 51st highest-grossing film of 2021.

== Plot ==
The story begins with an old farmer calling out his three sons and showing them a trampled field of wheat. The father instructs his sons to stand guard at night, so that they will find out who trampled the wheat, and the brothers, in turn, send the youngest, Ivan the fool (John), there instead.

At night, John, sweetly chatting with the hedgehog, which he had previously saved, sees the outline of a mare and throws the rope into a misty cloud. Suddenly, the rope tightens, and the mare begins to carry him across the fields and meadows. They fall into a swamp, and John pulls out the drowning mare using a waterwheel. Being bound, she cries, and the hero, feeling sorry for her, lets her go free, given the word that she will no longer trample on their fields. The next morning, in the stable, he discovers two horses and meets a small Humpbacked Magic Foal. He says that he was sent by his mother mare to help and support him in any way. John, wanting to get money for the horses, leads them to the bazaar. There, the king sees them and gives orders to take them to his stables, saying that they are actually his horses now. Having received no money, John asks the Foal to help him, and he calls the horses back with a whistle. The King offers John the position of the most important groom, and he agrees.

Over time, the people begin to love John more and more. The king wants to execute him, but can't find a reason. The Sleeping Bag suggests sending the groom to retrieve The Firebird, and then executing him for not following the King's order, as he thinks that John will not be able to find it. John and Foal go in search of the Firebird. After collecting the dream-nuts, they find the bird's shelter and pour them out to it. The bird, having eaten all the nuts, falls asleep. John puts it in chains. The next morning, the Foal tells him that the bird can only get hot when it's free. In chains, it cries, and John lets it go free. On their return, the executioners lead John to the block. He claims that he caught the Firebird, but released it, but no one believes him despite bringing back feather from it. When the axe is already raised over his head, the Firebird appears, and the execution is canceled.

The King, hating John more and more, at the instigation of the Sleeping Bag, sends him to retrieve the Tsar-maiden, thinking that he will not be able to cope with this task, since the maiden lives in an Ice country on a high rock. However, John and Foal reach their destination. The girl wakes up from a dream and tells John that she does not want to get married because there are no heroes left, and then jumps into the abyss. John does not hesitate to rush after her before both of them get picked up by Foal who can actually fly.

The king wants to get married right away, but the girl refuses to do so without her grandmother's ring, which she dropped in the ocean years ago. John, who has already fallen in love with the Tsar-maiden, asks the King for the impossible job, so as not to think about the upcoming wedding and the maiden herself. The delighted King sends John to get the ring. John and Foal embark on an adventure in the Magical Roads. The Foal, after talking to the Sun, Moon, and Wind, finds out where the ring is, and he and John fly to the Whale Fish. As it turns out, the whale is chained up for swallowing ships years ago, but doesn't know how to set them free. John makes him sneeze, and the ships float out to sea once again. In gratitude, the whale sends them a crab, which brings them the Tsar-maiden's grandmother's ring.

On his return, John comes to the girl in the tower and asks her to marry him, not knowing that he's being watched. The King's guards break into the bedchamber and place John under arrest for attempted kidnapping whereas Foal is shot on the wing by the king. The king is ready to get married, but his bride asks him to rejuvenate himself according to her grandmother's recipe by bathing in cauldrons of boiling water, ice water, and boiling milk. The Sleeping Bag advises to test the cauldrons on John before the execution. At night, the girl tells the Foal that in the first cauldron, it is necessary to throw her grandmother's ring, in the second — the feather of the Firebird, and in the third - the flower of life and death that grows at the end of the world, and then John will remain alive. Foal goes in search of the flower despite a wounded wing. In the morning, the King hypocritically declares that he is giving John a chance at redemption, and orders him to jump into the cauldrons. In the first cauldron, the girl throws her ring, and John is carried out of there safely, in the second, the Firebird's feather falls in, and he also remains unharmed. At this time, the Foal finds the flower and learns from it that the one who picks it is waiting for death. Despite this warning, he plucks the flower to save John and manages to deliver it when John finds himself inside the third cauldron.

The renewed John appears before the maiden, and the King jumps into the first cauldron without hesitation. However, a huge bubble bursts out of the cauldron, which carries the cursing King away into the sky. The Foal patiently waits for his death, but the Tsar Maiden reveals to him that the words of the flower were just a test, and if he hadn't plucked it, he actually would've died, but now, he never will. Left without a king now, John becomes the people's new ruler with the maiden at his side as his queen before they proceed to getting married.

== Cast ==
- Anton Shagin as Ivan the Fool (English: John the Fool)
- Paulina Andreeva as the Tsar Maiden (Princess)
- Mikhail Yefremov as the King (voiced by Sergey Burunov)
- Yan Tsapnik as the Chamberlain of the bedchamber
- Oleg Taktarov as Voivode (English: Waywode)
- Yevgeny Kapitonov as the farmer
- Vitaly Kononov as Danila
- Ilya Borisov as Gavrila
- Andrey Feskov as Tryapkin-Tapkin, the couturier
- Sergey Byzgu, the Treasurer

=== Voices ===
- Pavel Derevyanko as The Little Humpbacked Horse, a Foal.
- Lyasan Utiasheva as The Firebird
- Aleksandr Semchev as the Chudo-Yudo Whale-fish
- Sergey Burunov as the Tsar (vocal cords for Mikhail Yefremov)

== Production ==
=== Development ===
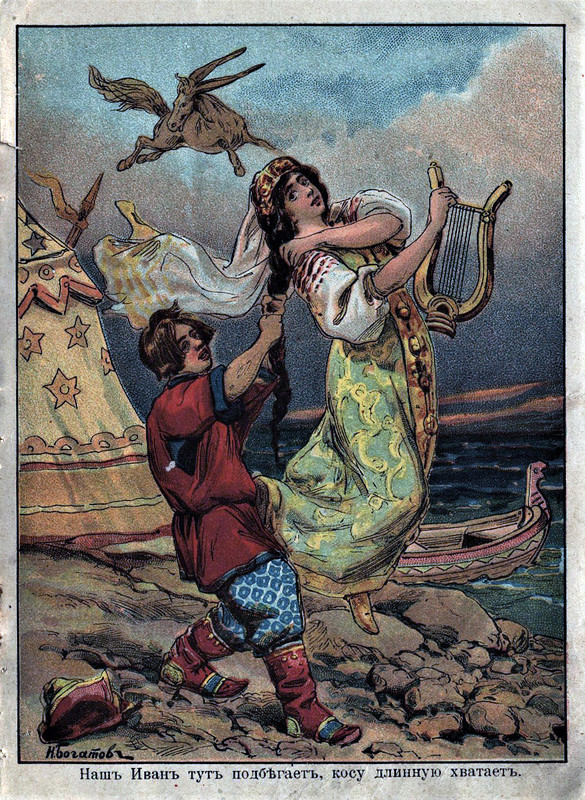
Illustration by Nikolay Bogatov for the book The Humpbacked Horse.

The Russian fairy tale is based on the work of Pyotr Pavlovich Yershov, The Humpbacked Horse, first published in 1834. The book has become a classic of Russian literature. Despite the childish genre, the tale includes elements of social satire. In the Soviet Union, the manuscript was reprinted more than a hundred times due to its incredible popularity. The literary tale The Humpbacked Horse was named the cultural heritage of Russia and of the Tyumen Oblast.

In the birthplace of Yershov, Ishim, Tyumen Oblast, cultural events were held during the film's premiere. Yershov's role in the Russian literature was noted by Lyubov Nechaeva, head of the Ishim Museum Complex, who said: "Pyotr Pavlovich is our everything! Therefore, on the eve of the large-format premiere of The Humpbacked Horse, we decided to remind Russians again that this writer is of Siberian blood, and his small homeland is around Ishim."

The residents of Siberia organized an event that became international in nature. A flash mob was started in more than 30 Russian regions and included participants from France and Morocco.

In 1941, the first film adaptation of the fairy tale directed by Alexander Rowe took place. In 1947, Soyuzmultfilm released the second film adaptation of The Hunchback Horse, directed by Ivan Ivanov-Vano. More than half a century later, the third film adaptation, Upon the Magic Roads was released based on the script of director Oleg Pogodin, who has credits with works, including the TV series Sherlock Holmes. Pogodin wrote the script together with scriptwriter Alexey Borodachev. This is the third film adaptation of the fairy tale for cinemas. Today, the fairy tale is popular with the public. Since 2020, the Mariinsky Theatre's audience has crossed the 25 million mark. One of the performances was Shchedrin's ballet The Little Humpbacked Horse, which was viewed by 1.7 million users. The project was financed by the CTB Film Company with the support of the TV channel Russia-1 and Cinema Fund. Yershov's fairy tale is one of the favorite works of Sergey Selyanov, who in the early 2000s planned to adapt the story with Soviet Union director Sergey Ovcharov. However, at the time, the technology and budget were unsuitable. On April 17, 2018, the concept art Upon the Magic Roads was published. The script transformed the poetry of Yershov's characters for film adaptations. The film was produced by Sergey Selyanov, Anton Zlatopolsky and Alexander Gorokhov. According to Sergey Selyanov, the film is a living fairy tale.

=== Casting ===
Actor Pavel Derevyanko voiced and acted as the Little Humpbacked Foal, using motion capture technology. The producers knew that Pavel Derevyanko was the best actor for the role of the character. The character is very well known from the donkey from Shrek or the horse Julius from The Three Heroes. According to Ershov's poem, the Little Humpbacked Foal turned into a flying horse or a pegasus. The Firebird was played by gymnast and TV presenter Lyaysan Utyasheva. Martial arts master and actor Oleg Taktarov played the role of the Tsarist governor. The governor's costume required multi layer fur coats.

The main role was played by Anton Shagin, who, after many auditions, got the role of Ivan the Fool. Paulina Andreeva starred as The Tsar Maiden. The film is intended for all viewers and especially for children - “It seems to me that this is a fairy tale for all times. If we, our heroes, will be associated for children with their childhood, if they matured and say 'We grew up watching your films', this will be the greatest joy for me,”says Paulina Andreeva.

=== Filming ===
The special effects were created by the computer graphics studio CGF. CGF is one of the largest virtual effects studios in Russia, directed by Alexander Gorokhov, who became one of the film's producers. Alexander Gorokhov noted that only with powerful visualization can this story be told. CGF used Blizzard software for filming.

The scenery in the film goes beyond the imagination of the director. At some point, the heroes will fall into the nostril of a giant whale, as well as into a bizarre oasis where The Firebird lives. One of the highlights in the film is when John finds the Tsar Maiden in the crystal palace, referring to Yershov's poems as if he were finding a doll that refers to the sleeping princess from Pushkin's fairy tales. The artists used the motif of frozen ice and silver to create the Tsar Maiden at this moment of discovery. The costume was of European character and the collar was laser cut with a silver ornament.

The complex production of the film required engineering decisions from the film crew. There were three sets: interiors, landscapes, a city with a village. Production designers Anastasia Karimulina and Isabela Tikhonskaya, together with three teams of technicians and a team of sculptors, built parts of the sets in the pavilions. CGF curators continued to build in the virtual world. The architecture drew inspiration from the visual style of wooden architecture and white stone architecture of medieval cities in Russia. Russian Art Nouveau combined with fairy-tale elements - facades decorated in the style of animals and birds, flowers and ornaments, similar to the Apartment House of the Trinity Church on Gryazekh in Moscow. The designers also presented ceramic tiles with images of animals and Russian wooden toys.

A full-fledged Russian fairy-tale scene was built in the architectural style. Filming began in a large studio with an area of over 7,000 sq. meters. The stage consisted of three pavilions the size of a football field each. According to the stage designers, the fairy tale city emerged from the market, which had five houses, a gate and part of a palace. The work was very difficult. To this end, they named their city Isabelsk-on-Tears. Giant cauldrons, modeled on Russian coins with a touch of green patina, are part of the film's visual production. According to Yershov's tale, the royal chambers can be turned into a bedroom and a throne room. The wooden bed was skillfully carved and decorated with an Orenburg downy shawl.

Upon the Magic Roads became one of the flagship films of 2021 in Russia. According to Kulturomania it is said to be a sumptuous carnival of modern adaptation of the tale, transforming Yershov's immortal tale into cinematic prose with some additional plot changes for the sake of entertainment and dynamics. The primary framework of friendship between the characters John and Foal, the Humpbacked Horse has been preserved. Additionally, the writers added a story line between John's love for the Tsar Maiden. The script was written specifically to entertain both children and family audiences, finding the right balance between the two genres. The score and the soundtrack for the film were directed by three composers, including Ivan Burlyaev. Burlyaev noted that the delay in the schedule allowed them to rearrange the scores, allowing them to find new themes. This is one of the first cases when Burlyaev wrote music for epic fantasy fairy tale genres. Principal photography of the film was shot in Saint Petersburg in the summer of 2018, and was completed closer to the fall that year.

=== Post-production ===
Principal photography of the film was shot in Saint Petersburg in the summer of 2018, and was completed closer to the fall that year. The main achievement was the costumes, which consisted of more than 50 different items, including caftans and special dresses for the queen. Professional costume designers worked on the clothes under the guidance of Nadezhda Vasilyeva and Olga Ostroumova. Nadezhda Vasilyeva was the costume designer for all films by Alexei Balabanov.

A variety of techniques have been used to transform fabrics into colorful costumes. The sketches turned into embroidery with an emphasis on the fabulous component. All sundresses, caftans and hats were embroidered by hand. For the crowd alone, three hundred suits were made. There were different versions of the Tsar-Maiden costumes. At first, the costume for John was considered linen. However, linen was not suitable for Anton Shagin, who played John. Nadezhda Vasilyeva changed the style, and the final image was a handmade woolen sweater trimmed with chintz. An exhibition of costumes for the film will open at the Lenfilm studio.

== Release ==
=== Theatrical ===
Upon the Magic Roads was originally scheduled to be theatrically released on October 22, 2020, but its release was postponed to February 18, 2021, in Russia. COVID-19 postponed the release of the film. The marketing of the film was launched to refresh the memory of the film. The trailers went on the air two years ago. Russia 1 TV channel and Sony Pictures Productions and Releasing (SPPR) have formed a promotional program for the film. The premiere of the adventure fantasy film Upon the Magic Roads took place in Moscow at the "Karo 11 October" cinema. At the 2021 Key Buyers Event worldwide distribution plans were signed. World Cinema will distribute the film to South Korea and Grindstone Entertainment Group acquired the North American rights to the film. The media group plans to release the film in 2022. On 6 July 2021, the Cannes Film Market featured the signing of the film's distribution plans to Japan by New Select. The film could have a sequel.

== Reception ==
=== Critical response ===
In a review of KinoPoisk, Mikhail Morkin says that the creative period of costumes in Russian history dates back to the early Soviet period, when the opera-ballet The Golden Cockerel was staged not only in Russia, but also by Diaghilev's Russian troupe in Paris. The review dispelled all doubts about the impossibility of continuing the creative legacy of Soviet times: “But here it is, a miracle: in the Little Humpbacked Horse there is a character with a weather vane on his head, and he is organically inscribed in the space of the capital's Tsar Grad. And what shirts, what sundresses and brocade robes, what hats - this certainly cannot be said in a fairy tale and cannot be described with a pen."

Susanna Alperina's review of Rossiyskaya Gazeta says that before the premiere, everyone is waiting to see if the plot matches the original material. The review says that the film is worth watching, noting: "In the film, anyone will see familiar motives and will be amazed at the relevance of Peter Ershov's fairy tale, written back in 1830." Rodion Chemonin for Film.ru noted that the well-established translations of Ershov's poem “from a poetic source into a prosaic one” by Alexei Borodachev and Oleg Pogodin are stable. In addition, Chemonin said, “For starters, the 2021 Little Humpbacked Horse from director Oleg Pogodin is a very beautiful picture. Bright backgrounds, elaborate fantastic animals, birds and fish, exceptionally finely selected colors, well-placed light - it's all amazing."

The Kommersant review notes that, despite the adversity faced by the consequences of COVID-19, as well as analysts' predictions of below average results due to the delay in “high-budget films,” fate “turned this film from another popular blockbuster into an unexpectedly perky pamphlet. with the logo "Russia" in the opening credits." In the review of Novaya Gazeta Larisa Malyukova notes that the main roles of the actors were at their best. Anton Shagin “demonstrates to Vanin his youthful ardor, naivety and innocence” while “Paulina Andreeva plays a witty, emancipated person, capable of building a whole kingdom into a frunt, walks around in the costume of Baron Munchausen, does not climb into his pocket for a word, leads the tsar by the nose, herself her betrothed chooses. "You are the main thing, Wan, do not yawn, look at both!" - instructs the simple-minded peasant son Konyok."

=== Box office and VOD ===
On the day of the premiere, Upon the Magic Roads topped Russia's box office. Pre-sales broke records set by major Hollywood companies. The largest record of 251.2 million rubles for the premiere weekend surpassed the previous records set by Mulan (2020 film) and The Croods: A New Age (2020). On February 20, the film raised 58 million ₽ in two days. At the end of the first weekend, the film continued to top the box office in Russia and the CIS, earning a total box office revenues of 581 million ₽. At the end of the second week of distribution, the film had only a 16% drop in viewership.

By the end of February, a record was set for the Russian film industry. Upon the Magic Roads has already been watched by 2.29 million people, and which in the first six days after its release, collected 585.2 million rubles, took first place in the box office rating. 45% of proceeds and 48% of tickets sold came from a fairy tale film. In addition, average attendance over the weekend ranged from 60 to 62 people per session. Preliminary opinion polls show that 74% of the audience were families.

Viewers' opinions are generally positive. The Russian film industry entered a new historical moment when the film became the highest-grossing film adaptation of classic Russian literature. At a moment in time, the film marked the rise of the Russian film industry as the second largest film market in the world in 2021, overtaking major cinema industries such as those in United States and the United Kingdom, with the cinema industry of China being the largest film market.

In March, the average attendance was above average: 46 on Saturday and 51 on Sunday. The second weekend on the screens brought 240.1 million rubles with a total cash register of 850 million rubles. In eleven days, 3.36 million people attended the sessions. On March 9, 2021, the film crossed the billion-ruble mark. The record was set in 18.5 days. On holiday weekends, the film is ranked the first in average attendance. In less than three weeks of distribution, the film managed to maintain the record, increasing its average attendance to four million people. The film has currently collected a total of $19 million. The film is currently the 51st highest-grossing film of 2021.

The film was released on video-on-demand in Russia on April 1, 2021, by Sony Pictures Home Entertainment.

== See also ==
- The Little Humpbacked Horse (ballet)
- Blue Blink (1989 anime television series)
