= The Little Humpbacked Horse (disambiguation) =

The Little Humpbacked Horse is a Russian literary fairy tale.

The title may also refer to:

- The Little Humpbacked Horse (ballet), a 1864 ballet and many its revivals
- The Little Humpbacked Horse (1941 film)
- The Little Humpbacked Horse (1947 film)

== See also ==
- Upon the Magic Roads, the 2021 Russian film with the same Russian-language title
