= The Little Humpbacked Horse (1947 film) =

1947 animated film

- DVD cover (Krupnyy Plan)
- Directed by: I. Ivanov-Vano; B. Butakov
- Screenplay by: A. Surkov; A. Volkov
- Story by: P. Ershov
- Based on: The Humpbacked Horse by Pyotr Pavlovich Yershov
- Produced by: C.B. Wismar
- Starring: Georgiy Millyar; Georgy Vitsin; Valentina Sperantova; Anatoly Kubatsky; Leonid Pirogov; Alexander Kachanov
- Cinematography: N. Voinov
- Edited by: E. Tertychnaya
- Music by: V. Oranskiy
- Distributed by: Soyuzmultfilm
- Release dates: January 10, 1947 (USSR); May 5, 1949 (USA)
- Running time: 57 minutes
- Country: Soviet Russia
- Language: Russian

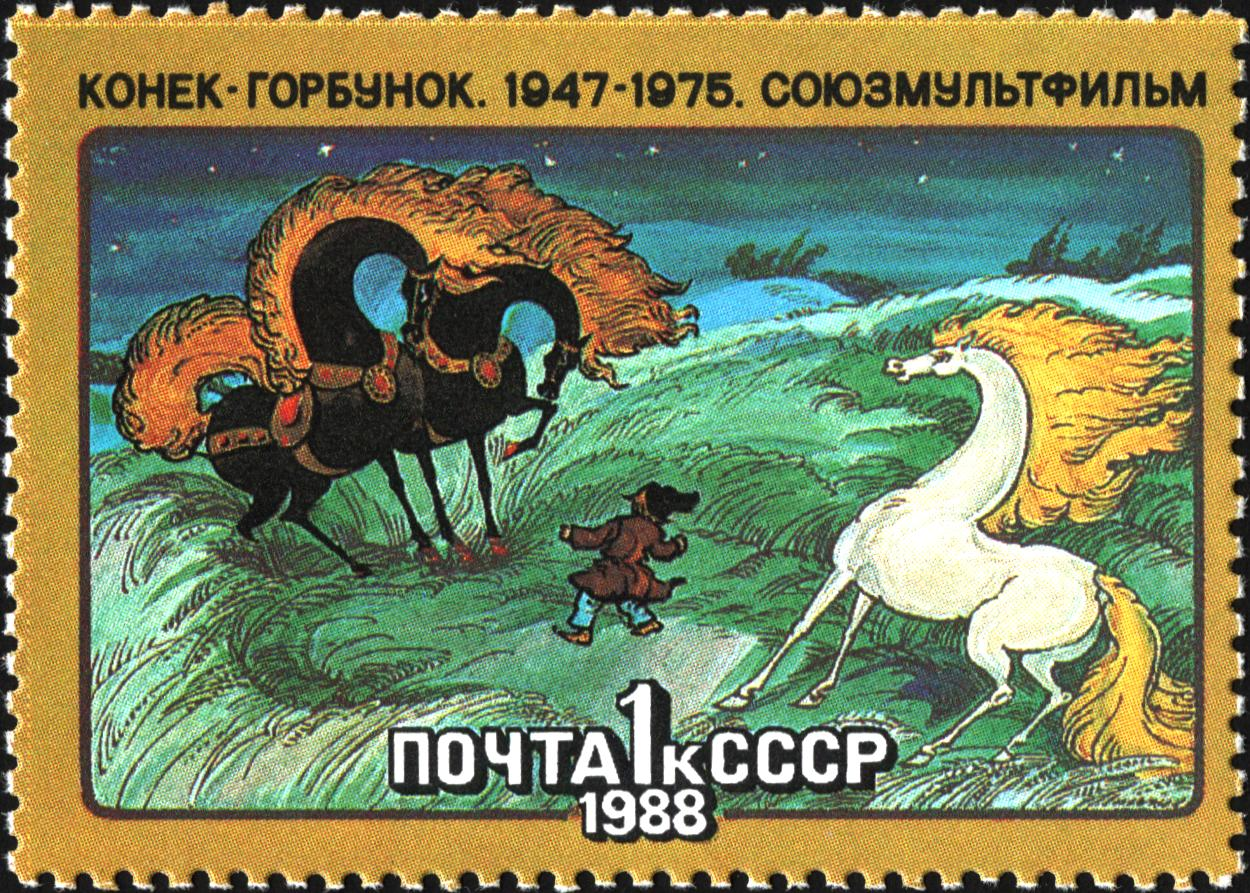
Soviet stamp from 1988 based on the film.

The Little Humpbacked Horse (Russian: Конёк-Горбуно́к; tr.:Konyok Gorbunok, that is The Little Horse - Little Humpback), is a 1947 Soviet/Russian traditionally animated feature film directed by I. Ivanov-Vano and produced by the Soyuzmultfilm studio in Moscow. The film is based on the literary fairy tale poem with the same title by Pyotr Pavlovich Yershov, and because of this, it is spoken in rhyme. The English dub has few rhymes and is not an overall feature.

A remake also by Ivanov-Vano and Soyuzmultfilm was released in 1975. This version, translated in English by George Molko, was released on October 25, 1977, as The Magic Pony.

== Plot ==
An old man has three sons: the elder two are considered fairly smart, while the youngest, Ivan, is considered a "fool." One day the father sends the three to find out who's been taking the hay in their fields at night. The elder brothers decide to lie hidden in a haystack, where they promptly fall asleep. Ivan, meanwhile, sits beside a birch tree and plays on his recorder. Suddenly, he sees a magnificent horse come flying out of the sky. Ivan grabs her mane and holds on as the horse tries to shake him off. Finally, the horse begs him to let her go and in return gives him two beautiful black stallions and a little humpbacked horse (Konyok-gorbunok) to be his companion.

Ivan leads the two black horses to a stable and runs off with Konyok-gorbunok to fetch them buckets of water. When he comes back, he finds that his brothers have taken his horses. Konyok-gorbunok tells him that they will catch them in the city, so Ivan sits on its back and they go flying through the clouds. Along the way, Ivan finds the fiery feather of a firebird, which shines without giving off any heat, and takes it despite Konyok-gorbunok's warning that it will cause him difficulty later.

They reach the city, and Ivan outwits his brothers and sells his black horses to the Tsar. When it is found that nobody can control them except Ivan, he is put in charge of the Tsar's stables. Spalnik, one of the Tsar's courtiers (identified as a chamberlain in the original Russian and either a soothsayer or a groom in various English dubbings), takes a disliking to Ivan and hides himself in the stables to watch him at work so that he can think of a way to remove him from the Tsar's favour. After seeing Ivan use the firebird's feather for light, he steals it from him and shows it to the Tsar, who commands Ivan to catch him a firebird or lose his post.

With Konyok-gorbunok's help, Ivan catches one and brings it back to the Tsar. Spalnik tells the Tsar to make Ivan catch a beautiful Tsar-Maid, so the Tsar summons him and tells him that the consequences will be dire if he doesn't bring her within three weeks. Ivan again manages to do this.

The elderly Tsar is overjoyed and begs the young Tsar-Maid to marry him, but she refuses, telling him that she would only marry him if he were young and handsome, and that to become young and handsome he would need to bathe first in boiling milk, then in boiling water, and finally in freezing water. Spalnik tells him to try this out on Ivan first, hoping at last to be rid of his nemesis. The Tsar agrees, and when Ivan protests upon being told of this the Tsar orders him to be thrown into prison until everything is ready the next morning. Konyok-gorbunok comes to Ivan and through the prison bars tells him not to worry - to simply whistle for him in the morning and let him put a magic spell on the water so that it will not be harmful to him. Spalnik overhears this, and kidnaps Konyok-gorbunok just as he is walking away from Ivan.

In the morning, Ivan whistles for Konyok-gorbunok, who is tied up in a bag. He manages to free himself eventually, knocking Spalnik out a window and into a well. Spalnik presumably falls to his death when the rope holding the bucket breaks, and Konyok-gorbunok comes to Ivan's rescue at the last moment, putting a spell on each of the cauldrons. Ivan jumps into the boiling milk, then the boiling water and then the freezing water, and emerges as a handsome young man instead of a boy. The young Tsar-Maid falls in love with him and they walk away. Meanwhile, the Tsar gets excited and decides that he also wants to be young and handsome. However, the spell is no longer working, so after he jumps into the boiling milk he doesn't come back out. Ivan, meanwhile, takes the Tsar-Maid as his own wife and becomes the new Tsar, with Konyok-gorbunok continuing to follow him as his friend.

== Creators ==
Position	Latin	Cyrillic
Directed by	Ivan Ivanov-Vano	Иван Иванов-Вано
Co-directors	Victor Gromov; Alexandra Snezhko-Blotskaya	Виктор Громов; Александра Снежко-Блоцкая
Story by	Pyotr Pavlovich Yershov	Пётр Павлович Ершов
Script Editor	A. Surkov	А. Сурков
Screenplay by	Nikolai Rozhkov; Yevgeniy Pomeshchikov	Николай Рожков; Евгений Помещиков
Production Designer	Lev Milchin	Лев Мильчин
Art Directors	V. Rodzhero; G. Nevzorova; Aleksandr Belyakov; I. Troyanova; O. Gemmerling	В. Роджеро; Г. Невзорова; Александр Беляков; И. Троянова; О. Геммерлинг
Animators	Grigoriy Kozlov; Nadezhda Privalova; Nikolai Fyodorov; Tatyana Fyodorova; K. Malyshev; Joseph Staryuk; Boris Dezhkin; B. Petin; Mikhail Botov; Boris Titov; Lidia Reztsova; Valentin Lalayants; Dmitriy Byelov; Faina Yenifanova; Roman Davydov; A. Manafov; Pyotr Repkin	Григорий Козлов; Надежда Привалова; Николай Фёдоров; Татьяна Фёдорова; Кв. Малышев; Иосиф Старюк; Борис Дежкин; Б. Петин; Михаил Ботов; Борис Титов; Лидия Резцова; Валентин Лалаянц; Дмитрий Белов; Фаина Епифанова; Роман Давыдов; А. Манафов; Пётр Репкин
Camera Operator	Nikolai Boinov	Николай Воинов
Composer	Victor Oranskiy	Виктор Оранский
Executive Producer	Boris Wolf	Борис Вольф
Sound Operator	N. Bazhenov	Н. Баженов
Voice Actors	Alexander Kachanov; Georgy Millyar (the Tsar); Georgy Vitsin (the chamberlain); Valentina Sperantova (Ivan); Leonid Pirogov (Danilo); Nonna Yastrebova (The Mare); Georgy Chernovolenko (the reader); Galina Novozhilova (the Tsar-Maid); Anatoly Kubatsky (Gavrilo)	Александр Качанов; Георгий Милляр (царь); Георгий Вицин (спальник); Валентина Сперантова (Иван); Леонид Пирогов (Данило); Нонна Ястребова (кобылица); Георгий Черноволенко (чтец); Галина Новожилова (Царь-девица); Анатолий Кубацкий (Гаврило)
Editor	N. Aravina	Н. Аравина

== Awards ==
Version of 1947

- 1948 — the Honourable diploma on the III MKF in Mariana Laznyakh (CSR).
- 1950 — the Special award of jury on the IV MKF in Cannes.

Version of 1975

- 1977 (November) — the bronze medal for the best animated film on category of children's movies on the VI MKF in Tehran.

== Interesting facts ==
In the opening credits of 1947 version Ivan Ivanov-Vano is credited as "I. Vano", but the cast and narrator are uncredited.

In the book "Shot Off-screen" Ivan Ivanov-Vano writes: "In film distribution, on a film studio there are letters with a request again to release "Konyok-gorbunok". But the movie negative was badly damaged, and to print new copies from it was impossible". When these lines were written, Vano finished work on the new version.

In 1988 the USSR mail released a series (6 pieces) of stamps "Animated films". One of brands was devoted to the animated film "Konyok-Gorbunok".

Appreciation to the movie was given by Walt Disney, who showed it to his animators and artists.

== 1975 version ==
In 1975 Ivan Ivanov-Vano made another version of the same film. The 1975 film is 73 minutes long; 18 minutes longer than the original. Although the progression of scenes and their plot content is usually the same as in the original, the animation and specific actions of the characters are different; for example, a scene may be taken from a different angle or in a different location (all of the backgrounds were also newly drawn). Sometimes a scene was drawn out, other times contracted (for example, the scene where Ivan first sees the white horse is much-simplified compared to 1947). The cartoon keeps the plot of Ivan getting Tsar-Maid's ring from the sea at her demand, with the help of a giant whale, absent in the 1947 cartoon.

This was done because the original film was then in a very bad shape and the technical expertise for a restoration did not exist. In 2004, with the technical expertise now existing in Russia, the original film was restored and released on DVD by Krupnyy Plan (Крупный План).

The 1975 version was redubbed, recut and released in the United States as The Magic Pony on October 25, 1977, with Erin Moran voicing the Magic Pony, Jim Backus as the voice of the Tsar, Hans Conried as Spalnik and Johnny Whitaker as Ivan. This version of the film was first released on VHS in the early 1980s by Video Warehouse, Inc, and later again in 1984 by Vestron Video through their Children's Video Library division. Starmaker Entertainment and Anchor Bay Entertainment released it on VHS again in 1995.

Another English dub was done in 1995 by Films by Jove for the series Stories from My Childhood.

=== Voices ===
Character	Original	English
Ivan	Maria Vinogradova	Johnny Whitaker
The Magic Pony	Svetlana Kharlap	Erin Moran
Tsar	Alexey Gribov	Jim Backus
Spalnik	Georgy Vitsin	Hans Conried
Tsar-Maiden	Vera Enyutina	Unknown
The Monster Whale	Aleksandr Khanov	Unknown
Danilo	Anatoly Kubatsky	Unknown
Gavrilo	Roman Filippov	Unknown
The Mare	Vera Yenyutina	Unknown

Additional Voices

- Diana Alton
- Robb Cigne
- John Craig
- Wayne Heffley
- Jason Wingreen
- Sandra Wirth

== Home video ==
Both versions of The Humpbacked Horse have been released on home video. In the 1980s, Videoprogrammoy Goskino USSR (Видеопрограммой Госкино СССР) released the film in the SECAM system, and later in the 1990s in the PAL system. The 1975 edition was released on home video by film association Krupny Plan in the early 1990s. Both were later released on VHS by Soyuzmultfilm, and also by Studio PRO Video in their collection "The Best Soviet Animated Films”.

The film has been issued on DVD from the 2000s on. The 1947 version has been restored and distributed by Krupny Plan. The 1975 version first received a DVD release in 2003, in the 5th release of “The Golden Collection of Favourite Cartoons”, and later on by Soyuzmultfilm in the animated film collection "Tale of a Fairy Tale".

== See also ==
- History of Russian animation
- List of animated feature films
- List of films based on poems
- The Little Humpbacked Horse (1941 film)
