= Blue Blink =

Japanese anime television series

- Blink and Kakeru

青いブリンク (Aoi Burinku)
- Genre: Fantasy, adventure
- Anime television series
- Directed by: Osamu Tezuka
- Written by: Osamu Tezuka; Takashi Yamada
- Music by: Hiroaki Serizawa
- Studio: Tezuka Productions
- Original network: NHK General TV
- Original run: 7 April 1989 – 16 March 1990
- Episodes: 39

Blue Blink (青いブリンク, Aoi Burinku) is a fantasy adventure anime series created by Osamu Tezuka. The anime is based on the classic Russian animated film Konjok-gorbunok by Ivan Ivanov-Vano, which in turn was based on Pyotr Pavlovich Yershov's fairy tale of the same name.

This was Tezuka's last anime series. Osamu Tezuka died while this series was in production. The studio completed the production according to his plans. The show was streamed at Anime Sols, but was removed, because it did not meet its goal of crowd-funding for DVD. It is currently only available for legal streaming at Viki.com.

== Story ==
The story opens with the meeting between the hero, Kakeru, and a mystical pony named Blink. Kakeru saves Blink from a thunder shower and in gratitude, Blink tells him that if he is ever in trouble, all Kakeru needs to do is call out his name three times and he will appear.

At the end of the summer when Kakeru returns home, his father, a writer of children's stories, is kidnapped. Kakeru, weeping, calls out Blink's name and, as promised, Blink immediately appears, and the two set out on the trail of Kakeru's father.

== Episode list ==
Episode	Title
1	Departing for Far, Far Away
2	The Secret of Grey Ranch
3	A Prisoner at Rose House
4	The Crooked Ivory Castle
5	The Monster Dogitra of Yellow Fort
6	The Mysterious Fruit of Blue Town
7	Crash! The Moss-Green Road Race!
8	The Island of Temptation — Cobalt
9	The Fighting Country — Red Baal
10	The Mysterious Forest — Sepia
11	Terrace — The Town of Primary Colours
12	The Heart-Thief of Purple Town
13	The Armored Gun-Train of Brown Town
14	Children's Town, Rainbow Town
15	The Light Ark of Gold Valley
16	The Town of Fortune-Telling: Mint Green
17	Milky White: The Secret of the Temple in the Air
18	Will It Bloom?: The Flower of Dark in Emerald Forest
19	To The Dark River! The Mysterious Ultra-Marine Plain!!
20	Animal Paradise: Harpy Green
21	Yellow Oaker: The Town With No Greenery or Flowers
22	The Plane of Love! Fly in the Persian Blue!!
23	The Legend of Davies Gray! Blink Turns into a Fossil!!
24	Submarine City: The Mermaid Princess of Palm
25	Blink Disappears in Opera Town
26	Revive! The Fluorescent Butterflies of Scarlet River
27	Mystery! The Castle of Adventures, Indigo
28	Love Again! Fierce Fight in the Wine Red Sea
29	Enemy or Friend? The Detective of Orange Stone
30	Find the Key of Truth! The Remains of Dark Purple Lake
31	Gold Amber Valley
32	The Upside Down City, Sky Blue
33	Meeting Again! Mother and Child in the Dark Jail
34	Lonely Kakeru! The Nightmare of the Dark Sea!!
35	The Strongest Soldier: Black Samurai
36	To the Dark Castle! Face Up with Courage
37	Prince Horo: The Bronze Trap
38	Gross Castle in Light and Darkness
39	Goodbye to the Endless Journey and Blink

== Original cast ==
- Masako Nozawa as Kakeru Shiki
- Miki Itou as Princess Kirara
- Ai Orikasa as Julie
- Goro Naya as Haruhiko Shiki, Kakeru's father
- Katsuya Kobayashi as Tanba the bus driver
- Kei Tomiyama as Henry
- Kenichi Ogata as Nitch the burglar
- Mari Mashiba as Spika
- Saori Tsuchiya as Blink (Magic)
- Satoko Yasunaga as Doctor Nana
- Sho Hayami as Prince Horo
- You Yoshimura as Satch the burglar
- Yuriko Fuchizaki as Rakururu

== Music ==
Title	English title	Performer	Description
Hitomi no Naka no Mirai	The Future in Your Eyes	Yoko Minamino	Opening song
Makenaide, Yuuki	Don't give in, have courage	Shinobu Nakayama	Ending song

== See also ==
- The Little Humpbacked Horse (ballet)
