= The Firebird =

1910 ballet by Igor Stravinsky

L'Oiseau de feu The Firebird
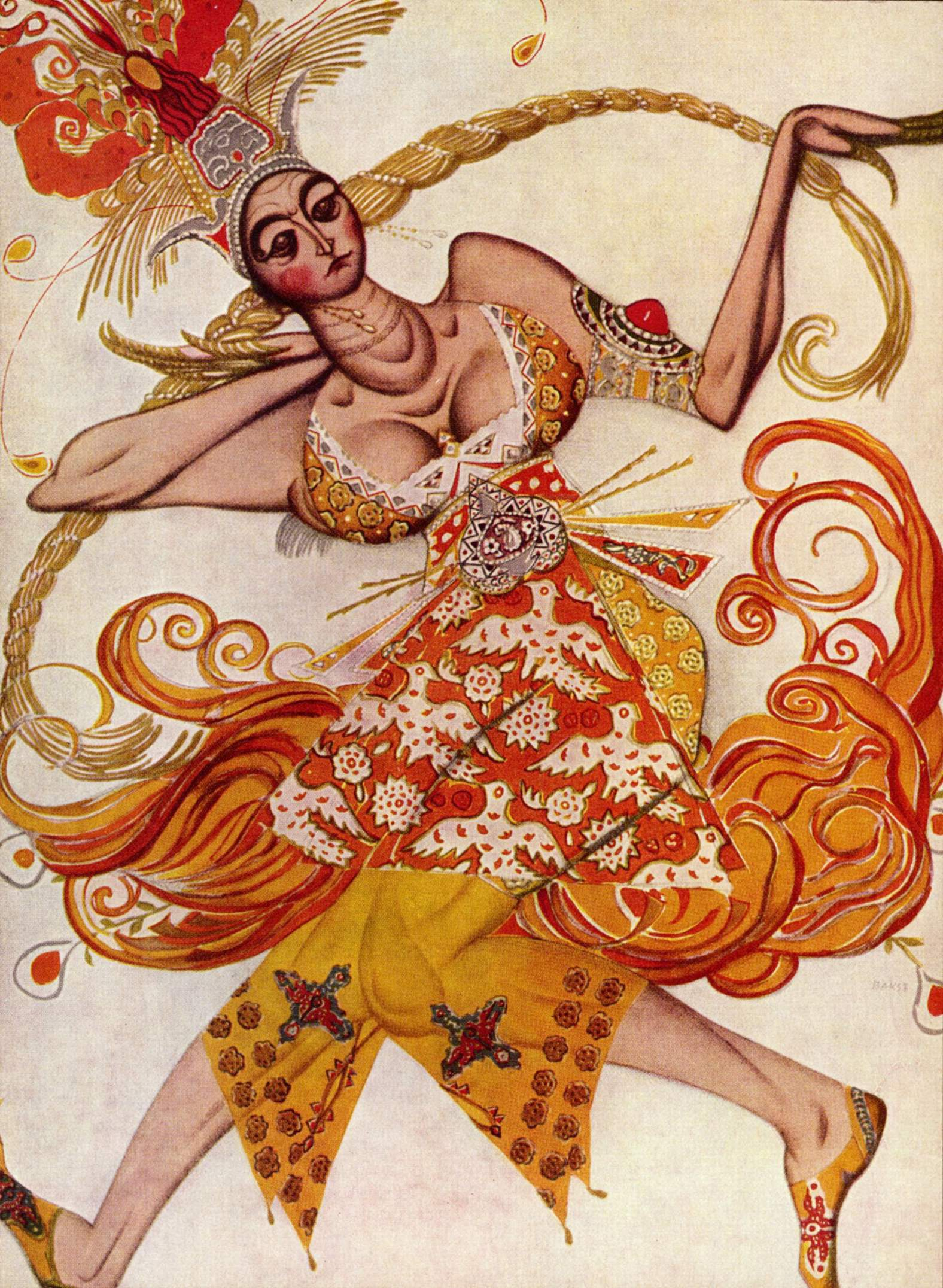
- Costume sketch for the titular Firebird by Léon Bakst, 1910
- Native title: French: L'Oiseau de feu Russian: Жар-птица, romanized: Zhar-ptitsa
- Choreographer: Michel Fokine
- Music: Igor Stravinsky
- Based on: Russian folk tales
- Premiere: 25 June 1910; Palais Garnier
- Original ballet company: Ballets Russes
- Design: Aleksandr Golovin (sets); Léon Bakst (costumes)

The Firebird (French: L'Oiseau de feu; Russian: Жар-птица, romanized: Zhar-ptitsa) is a ballet and orchestral concert work by the Russian composer Igor Stravinsky. It was written for the 1910 Paris season of Sergei Diaghilev's Ballets Russes company; the original choreography was by Michel Fokine, who collaborated with Alexandre Benois and others on a scenario based on the Russian fairy tales of the Firebird and the blessing and curse it possesses for its owner. It was first performed at the Opéra de Paris on 25 June 1910 and was an immediate success, catapulting Stravinsky to international fame and leading to future Diaghilev–Stravinsky collaborations including Petrushka (1911) and The Rite of Spring (1913).

The Firebird's mortal and supernatural elements are distinguished with a system of leitmotifs placed in the harmony dubbed "leit-harmony". Stravinsky intentionally used many specialist techniques in the orchestra, including ponticello, col legno, flautando, glissando, and flutter-tonguing. Set in the evil immortal Koschei's castle, the ballet follows Prince Ivan, who battles Koschei with the help of the magical Firebird.

Stravinsky later created three concert suites based on the work: in 1911, ending with the "Infernal Dance"; in 1919, which remains the most popular today; and in 1945, featuring significant reorchestration and structural changes. Other choreographers have staged the work with Fokine's original choreography or created entirely new productions using the music, some with new settings or themes. Many recordings of the suites have been made; the first was released in 1928, using the 1911 suite. A film version of the popular Sadler's Wells Ballet production, which revived Fokine's original choreography, was produced in 1959.

== History ==
=== Background ===
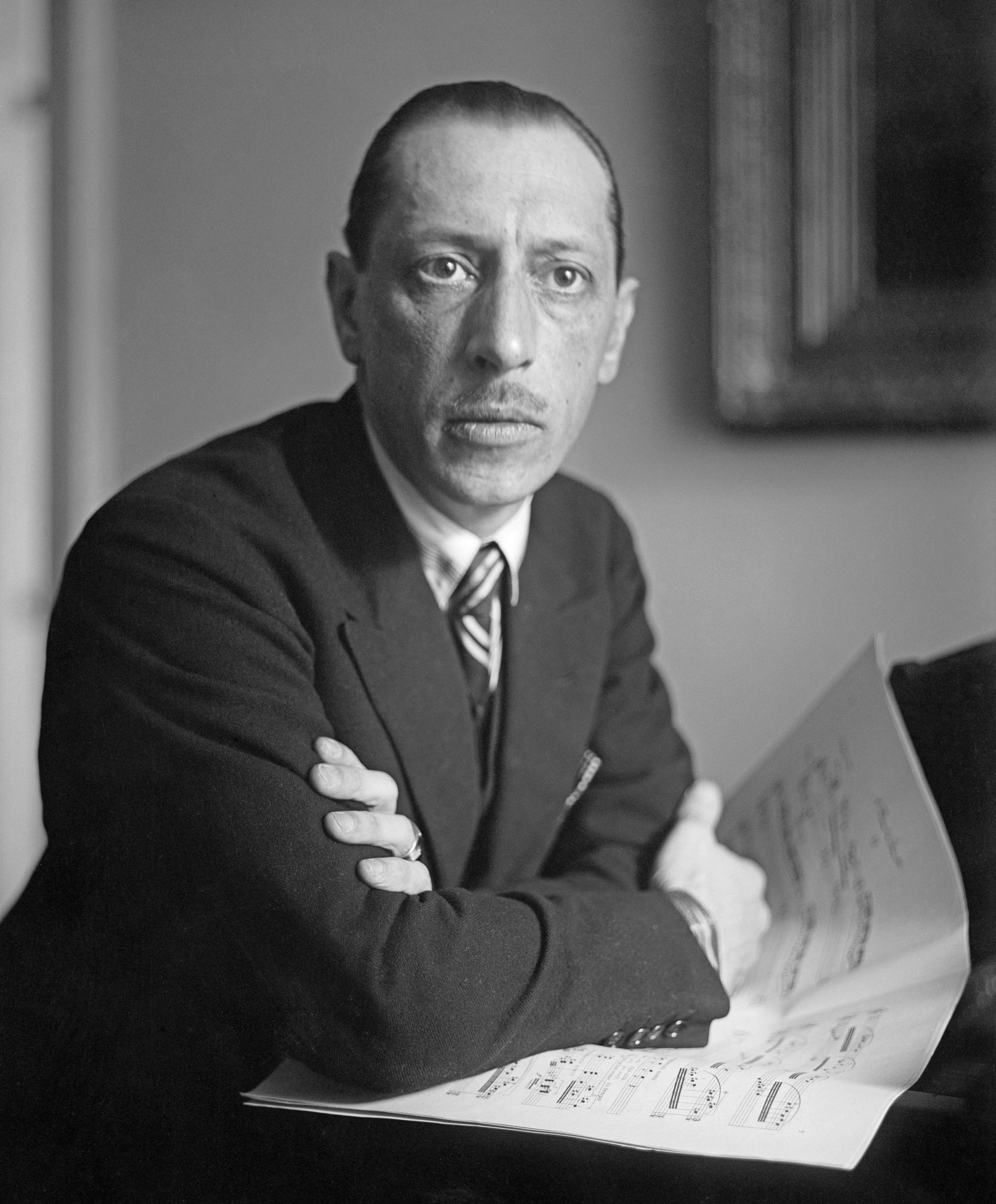
Igor Stravinsky, c. 1920s

Igor Stravinsky began studying composition with Nikolai Rimsky-Korsakov in 1902. He completed several works during his time as a student, including his first performed work, Pastorale (1907), and his first published work, the Symphony in E-flat (1907), which the composer categorized Opus 1. In February 1909, a performance of his Scherzo fantastique and Feu d'artifice in Saint Petersburg was attended by the impresario Sergei Diaghilev, who was intrigued by the vividness of Stravinsky's works.

Diaghilev founded the art magazine Mir iskusstva in 1898, but after it ended publication in 1904, he turned towards Paris for artistic opportunities rather than his native Russia. In 1907, Diaghilev presented a five-concert series of Russian music at the Paris Opera; the next year, he staged the Paris premiere of Rimsky-Korsakov's version of Boris Godunov. By 1909, Diaghilev had connected with Michel Fokine, Léon Bakst, and Alexandre Benois, and gained enough money to start his independent ballet company, the Ballets Russes. Diaghilev commissioned Stravinsky to orchestrate music by Chopin for the ballet Les Sylphides, and the composer was finished by March 1909.

Fokine was a renowned dancer, receiving first prize in his class upon graduation from the Imperial Theatre School in 1898; he subsequently entered the Mariinsky Ballet as a soloist and was promoted to lead dancer of the company in 1904. Fokine was dissatisfied with the ballet tradition of glamorous appeals to the audience and interruptions from viewers; he felt that dramatic dance should be strictly displayed with no interruption of illusion, and that the music should be closely connected to the theme. His 1907 ballets The Dying Swan and Les Sylphides were very successful and established Fokine as a competitor to other prominent choreographers. In 1908, Benois, a member of Diaghilev's Mir iskusstva circle and friend of Fokine's, arranged for the dancer to prepare a repertoire for the Ballets Russes' 1909 season as the company's first lead choreographer; the season was very successful, and Diaghilev began organizing plans for the 1910 season soon after.

=== Conception ===
As the Ballets Russes faced financial issues, Diaghilev wanted a new ballet with distinctly Russian music (Note: The Firebird was Diaghilev's first ballet with commissioned music.) and design, something that had recently become popular with French and other Western audiences (likely due to the glamorous charm of The Five's music). Fokine unofficially led a committee of artists to devise the scenario of this new ballet, including himself, Benois, the composer Nikolai Tcherepnin, and the painter Aleksandr Golovin. Benois recalled that Pyotr Petrovich Potyomkin, a poet and ballet enthusiast in Diaghilev's circle, proposed the subject of the Firebird to the artists, citing the 1844 poem "A Winter's Journey" by Yakov Polonsky that includes the lines:

And in my dreams I see myself on a wolf's back
Riding along a forest path
To do battle with a sorcerer-tsar
In that land where a princess sits under lock and key,
Pining behind massive walls.
There gardens surround a palace all of glass;
There Firebirds sing by night
And peck at golden fruit.

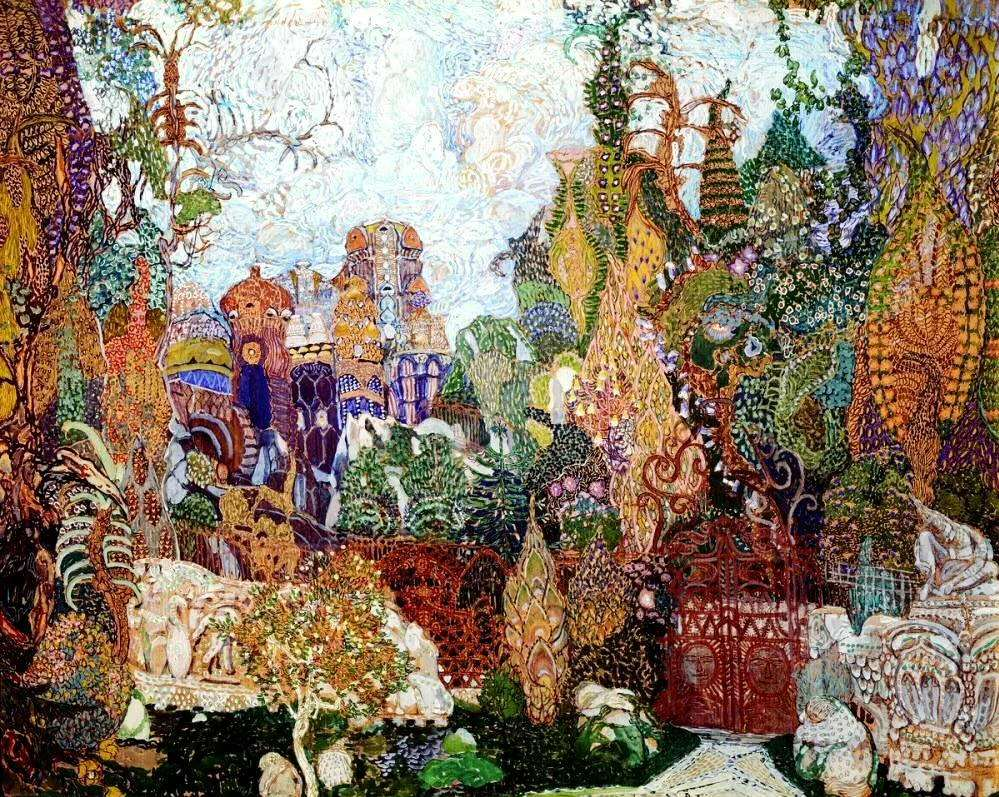
Sketch of scenery for The Firebird by Aleksandr Golovin, who designed the sets and co-designed costumes with Léon Bakst for the premiere

The committee drew from several books of Russian fairy tales, in particular Alexander Afanasyev's collection and Pyotr Pavlovich Yershov's The Little Humpbacked Horse. The immortal king Koschei (Note: Koschei (Russian: Коще́й, IPA: [kɐˈɕːej]) has different spellings owing to romanization conventions, including Kastchei, Kastcheï, Kashchei, and Koshchey.) and the captive Princess were incorporated from a Muscovite anthology of stories, which also helped determine the Firebird's role in the story. Fokine drew on the stark contrast between good and evil in Russian fairy tales while developing the ballet's characters. The choreographer blended fantasy and reality to create the scenario, a trope of romanticism found in many of Fokine's folkish ballets. Originally, Tcherepnin was to compose the music, as he had previously worked on Le Pavillon d'Armide with Fokine and Benois, but he withdrew from the project. Diaghilev then sought Anatoly Lyadov to compose the ballet; after considering Alexander Glazunov and Nikolay Sokolov, Diaghilev asked Stravinsky to compose the score upon encouragement from Tcherepnin and Boris Asafyev.

Stravinsky began work in October or November 1909, traveling to the Rimsky-Korsakov household with Andrey Rimsky-Korsakov, the son of Stravinsky's teacher and dedicatee of The Firebird's score. Because Stravinsky began work before Diaghilev officially commissioned him, the composer's sketches did not align with the scenario; the full story became known to him when he met with Fokine in December and received the ballet's planned structure. Fokine ensured the creation of the ballet was an equal effort between the producers and the composer, working closely with Stravinsky while developing the choreography. While the composer worked, Diaghilev organized private performances of the piano score for the press. The French critic Robert Brussel, a friend of Diaghilev's, wrote: "By the end of the first scene, I was conquered: by the last, I was lost in admiration. The manuscript on the music-rest, scored over with fine pencillings, revealed a masterpiece."

=== Development ===
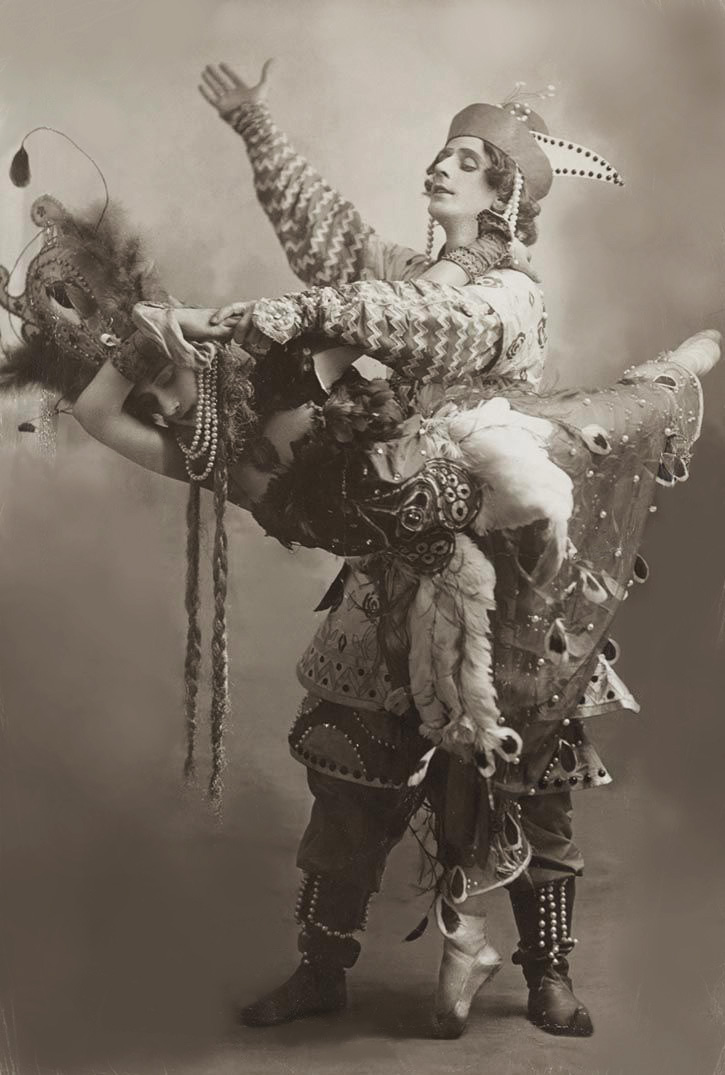
Tamara Karsavina as the Firebird and Michel Fokine as Prince Ivan in the 1910 Ballets Russes production

Despite later lamenting the "descriptive music of a kind I did not want to write", Stravinsky finished The Firebird in about six months, and had it fully orchestrated by mid-May 1910. Stravinsky arrived in Paris around the beginning of June to attend the premiere of his first stage work; it was his first visit to Paris.

Rehearsals began in Ekaterininsky Hall, and Stravinsky attended every rehearsal to help with the music, often explaining the complicated rhythms to the dancers. Tamara Karsavina, who originated the titular Firebird role, later recalled, "Often he came early to the theatre before a rehearsal began in order to play for me over and over again some particularly difficult passage." Stravinsky also worked closely with Gabriel Pierné, who conducted the premiere with the Colonne Orchestra, to "explain the music ... [but the musicians] found it no less bewildering than did the dancers". Two dress rehearsals were held to accommodate the dancers, many of whom missed their entrances due to the unexpected changes in the music, "which sounded quite different when played by the orchestra from what it had sounded like when played on a piano".

When the company arrived in Paris, the ballet was not finished, causing Fokine to extend rehearsals; he petitioned Diaghilev to postpone the premiere, but the impresario declined, fearing public disappointment. The Ballets Russes season began on 4 June 1910 with stagings of Schumann's Carnaval, Rimsky-Korsakov's Scheherazade, and short productions from the previous season.

Fokine's style of dance made great use of interpretive movement; he used ideas of expressiveness, naturalism, vitality, and stylistic consistency. The choreographer employed many forms of dance in The Firebird. The titular Firebird danced classically, Koschei and his subjects in a more violent and grotesque manner, and the Princesses in a looser, gentler way. The role of the Firebird differed from that of traditional ballerinas; female dancers often danced princesses, swans, and lovers, but the Firebird was a mysterious and abstract idea, represented as a magical force rather than a person. Her choreography featured exaggerated classical steps, with deep bending at the waist; Fokine wanted her to be "powerful, hard to manage, and rebellious" rather than graceful. This new kind of role for a female character was revolutionary for the ballet scene.

=== Premiere and reception ===
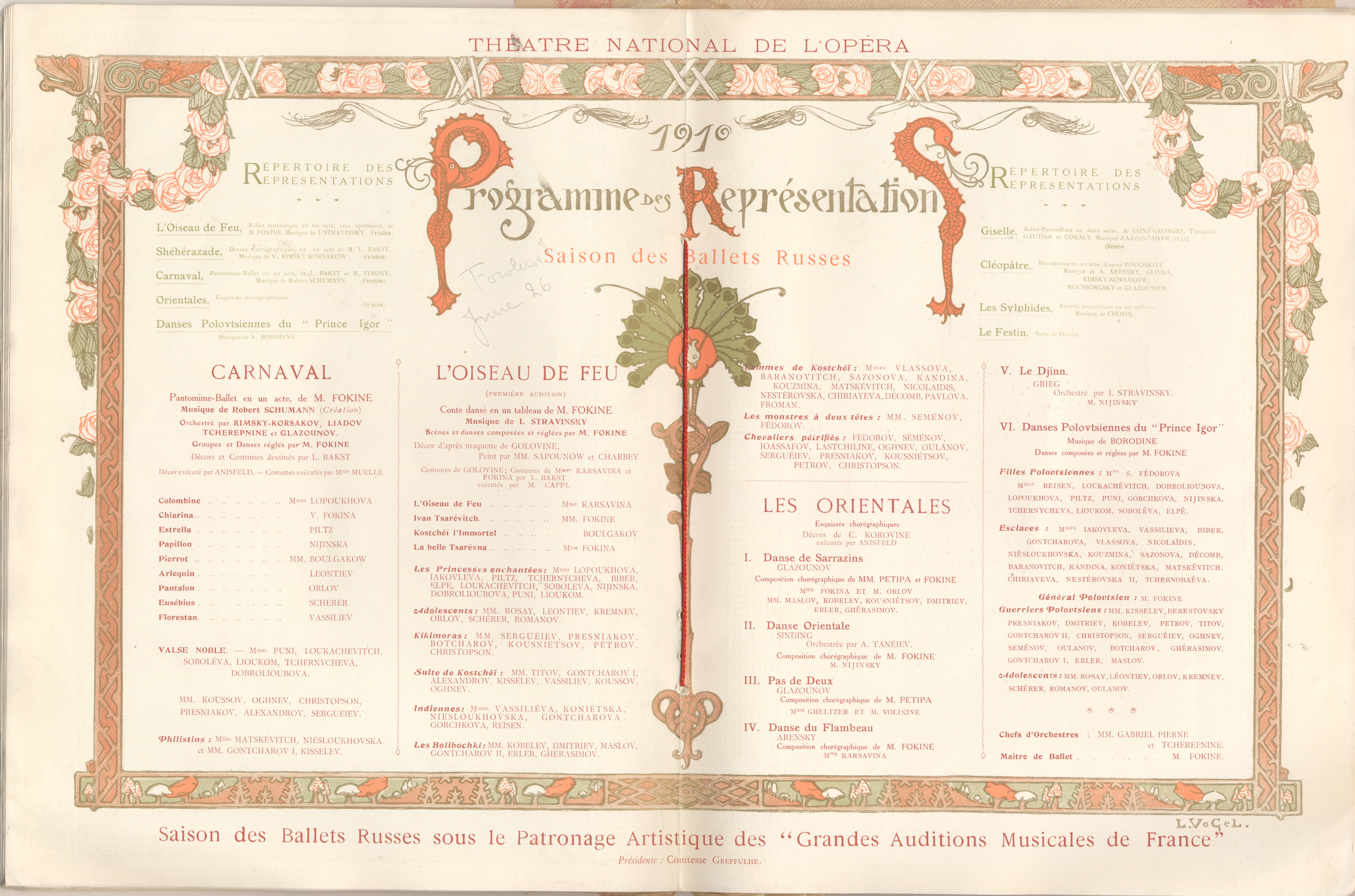
Program notes for the Ballets Russes' 1910 season, showing The Firebird in the second column

Excitement for the premiere was great, particularly in Diaghilev's circle of Mir iskusstva collaborators. The sculptor Dmitri Stelletsky, who helped develop the scenario, wrote to Golovin on 16 June, "I'm staying till Sunday; I must see The Firebird. I have seen your dazzling drawings and costumes. I like Stravinsky's music in the orchestra and the dances tremendously. I think the whole thing together with your sets will look spectacular. Serov has also put off his departure because of this ballet". Diaghilev remarked of Stravinsky during rehearsals, "Mark him well, he is a man on the eve of celebrity".

The Firebird premiered at the Palais Garnier on 25 June 1910, and was very well-received. The cast starred Karsavina as the Firebird, Fokine as Prince Ivan, Vera Fokina as the youngest princess, and Alexis Bulgakov as Koschei. Karsavina later told an interviewer, "With every performance, success went crescendo". Critics praised the ballet for the unity of the decor, choreography, and music. "The old-gold vermiculation of the fantastic back-cloth seems to have been invented to a formula identical with that of the shimmering web of the orchestra", wrote Henri Ghéon in Nouvelle revue française; he called the ballet "the most exquisite marvel of equilibrium" and added that Stravinsky was a "delicious musician". Fokine's choreography was seen as a triumph of his creative genius; the natural miming and many styles of dance displayed were popular with audiences.

Many critics praised Stravinsky's alignment with Russian nationalist music, one saying, "[Stravinsky is] the only one who has achieved more than mere attempts to promote Russia's true musical spirit and style". Michel-Dimitri Calvocoressi hailed the young composer as the legitimate heir to The Mighty Handful. Russian audiences viewed the work less favorably, and the Russian premiere was not well-received; according to a reviewer in Apollon, "Many deserted the Hall of Nobles during the performance of this suite." A fellow Rimsky-Korsakov pupil, Jāzeps Vītols, wrote that "Stravinsky, it seems, has forgotten the concept of pleasure in sound... [His] dissonances unfortunately quickly become wearying, because there are no ideas hidden behind them". Nikolai Myaskovsky reviewed the piano reduction of the full ballet in October 1911 and wrote, "What a wealth of invention, how much intelligence, temperament, talent, what a remarkable, what a rare piece of work this is".

Stravinsky recalled that after the premiere and subsequent performances, he met many figures in the Paris art scene, including Marcel Proust, Sarah Bernhardt, Jean Cocteau, Maurice Ravel, André Gide, and Princesse Edmond de Polignac. Claude Debussy was brought on stage after the premiere, and he invited Stravinsky to dinner, beginning a lifelong friendship between the two composers. According to Sergei Bertensson, Sergei Rachmaninoff said of the music: "Great God! What a work of genius this is! This is true Russia!" Debussy later said of Stravinsky's score, "What do you expect? One has to start somewhere." Richard Strauss told the composer in private that he had made a "mistake" in beginning the piece pianissimo instead of astonishing the public with a "sudden crash". Shortly after he summed up to the press his experience of hearing The Firebird for the first time by saying, "it's always interesting to hear one's imitators". Sergei Prokofiev, who first heard the piano reduction at a gathering, told Stravinsky, "there was no music in [the ballet's introduction] and if there was any, it was from Sadko".

In his 1962 autobiography, Stravinsky credited much of the production's success to Golovin's set and Diaghilev's collaborators; he wrote that Fokine's choreography "always seemed to me to be complicated and overburdened with plastic detail, so that the artists felt, and still feel now, great difficulty in co-ordinating their steps and gestures with the music". The ballet's success secured Stravinsky's position as Diaghilev's star composer, and there were immediate talks of a sequel, leading to the composition of Petrushka and The Rite of Spring.

=== Subsequent productions ===
After the success of the premiere, Diaghilev announced an expansion of performances until 7 July 1910, the last of which Stravinsky took his family to from their home in Ustilug. Andrey Rimsky-Korsakov quickly traveled to Paris to see the expanded run, and he later praised the production in a letter to his mother. Following the initial run, Alexander Siloti conducted the Russian premiere on 23 October, performing an early draft of the 1911 suite.

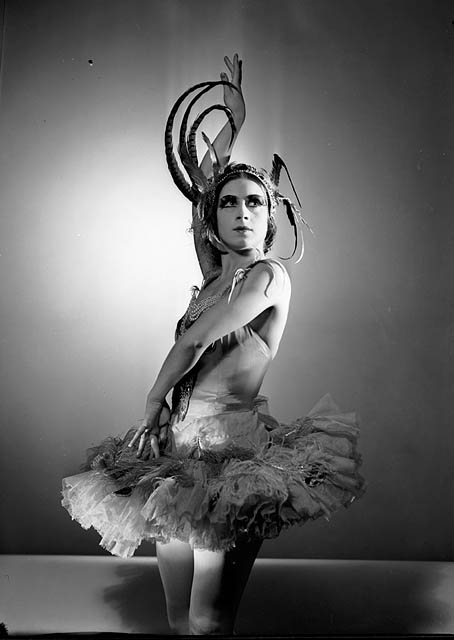
Valentina Blinova in the Ballets Russes de Monte Carlo 1935 production

The debut London season of the Ballets Russes took place in 1912 at the Royal Opera House. The third ballet on the program was The Firebird, which was well-received. Osbert Sitwell wrote: "Never until that evening had I heard Stravinsky's name; but as the ballet developed, it was impossible to mistake the genius of the composer, or of the artist who had designed the setting." The Ballets Russes revived the production in 1926 with new settings and costumes by Natalia Goncharova, using Fokine's original choreography. The revival was presented at the Lyceum Theatre in London. In 1916, the first productions of The Firebird and Petrushka on the Iberian peninsula took place; the Ballets Russes returned in 1921 for short season in Madrid. Several companies presented their own choreographies and designs of The Firebird from 1927 to 1933, including the Berlin State Opera, the Royal Swedish Ballet, the Royal Danish Ballet, and the Croatian National Theatre in Zagreb. In 1935 and 1940, Wassily de Basil's Ballets Russes de Monte Carlo revived the Ballets Russes production with Fokine's choreography and Goncharova's designs.

Many later revivals modeled their choreography after Fokine's, including Adolph Bolm's 1945 production at the Ballet Theatre and Serge Lifar's 1954 Paris Opera Ballet production. Serge Grigoriev and Lubov Tchernicheva's 1954 Sadler's Wells Ballet staging with Fokine's choreography is considered one of the most important and authentic revivals; Grigoriev and Tchernicheva worked for Diaghilev during the initial run, and the lead dancer, Margot Fonteyn, was coached by Karsavina. The Sadler's Wells staging also used Goncharova's 1926 designs. A film version of the revival was made in 1959.

New York City Ballet's first big hit as a company after their founding in 1948 was its staging of The Firebird the following year, with Maria Tallchief as the Firebird, choreography by George Balanchine, and scenery and costumes by Marc Chagall. Balanchine placed a heavy emphasis on the dancing rather than Stravinsky's score, establishing Tallchief as one of the first celebrity American-born and -trained ballerinas. Balanchine revised it in 1970 with Jerome Robbins, the latter of whom choreographed Koschei and his subjects' dance. The young Gelsey Kirkland danced the title role with a new costume inspired by Chagall's sets. New York City Ballet's production remains the most well-known and longest-lived revival in the United States.

Maurice Béjart's 1971 production differed from the traditional themes of the ballet; it featured a male Firebird, representative of the spirit of revolution, leading an all-male group of partisans clad in blue tunics and dungarees through political turmoil. After the Firebird, dressed in a red leotard, dies in battle, he "rises from the ashes and lives again", as Béjart said in an interview for The New Yorker. In 1970, John Neumeier devised a science-fiction production of the ballet set in a futuristic world but retaining the original plot. In the initial Oper Frankfurt production, Koschei is a large glass robot with CCTV eyes; the Firebird, wearing a white space suit, defeats him by destroying a specific valve in his system. Neumeier was praised by the critic Oleg Kerensky for giving the ballet "new life" and creating a fascinating effect for the audience "which the original Fokine-Golovine [sic] production must have had in Paris sixty years ago". Many other choreographers have staged the work with Fokine's original choreography or created entirely new productions using the music. Stagings with new choreography include John Cranko's 1964 production with the Stuttgart Ballet, Glen Tetley's 1981 staging with the Royal Danish Ballet, John Taras's 1982 Caribbean-set rendition with the Dance Theatre of Harlem, Christopher Wheeldon's 1999 production with the Boston Ballet, Krzysztof Pastor's 1999 version with the West Australian Ballet, and Alexei Ratmansky's 2012 production with the American Ballet Theatre.

=== Legacy ===
Critics praised the music of The Firebird's emotional character. Cyril W. Beaumont wrote that the work "is a supreme example of how music, although having no meaning in itself, can, particularly with a programme hint of its intention, evoke a mood appropriate to the ballet concerned." Robert Craft considered the music "as literal as opera", referring to the "mimetic specificity" with which the music follows the story, a trait Stravinsky later disliked and apologized for. The composer wrote that The Firebird became a centerpiece in his career; his conducting debut was a ballet performance of The Firebird in 1915, and he said that he performed it "nearly a thousand times" more.

Fokine's revolutionary Firebird character was part of an effort to combine new ideas with classical ballet, showing his wide-ranging abilities as a choreographer. He later described his style as a diversion from the "conventional system of gesticulation" and a move towards natural expression through movement. The wide resources and experienced artists that Fokine accessed allowed him to create massive productions like The Firebird. Each character or group had their own unique choreography, creating complex scenes like the "Infernal Dance", where the Firebird enchants Koschei's subjects but they all dance differently. Dance critic Alastair Macaulay called this the "most complex choreography that had ever been attempted in ballet" at the time.

== Music ==
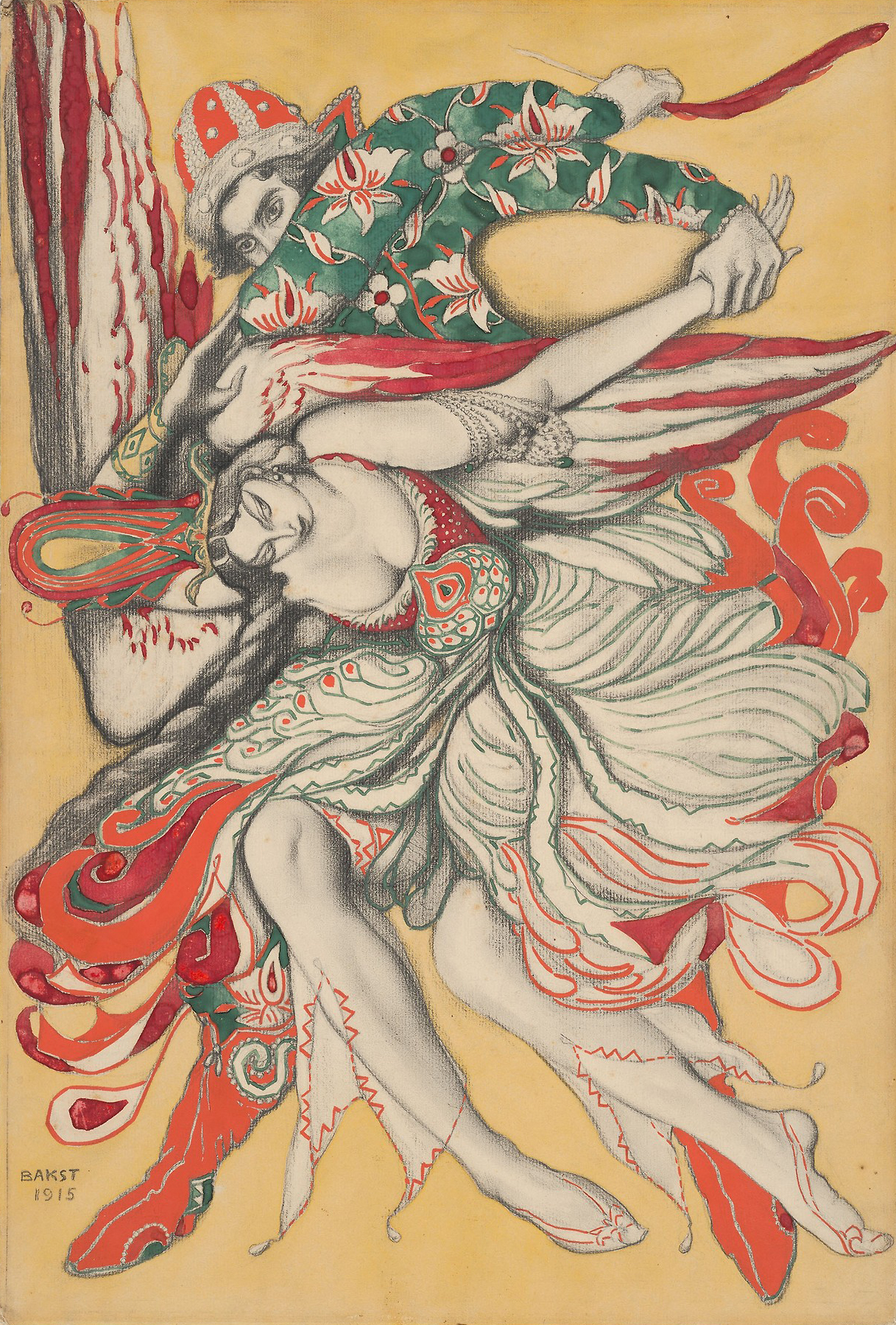
Drawing by Léon Bakst of Tsarevitch Ivan capturing the Firebird

Throughout the score, Stravinsky used leitmotifs (short, recurring musical phrases associated with a particular person, place, or thing) placed in the harmony, a system he later dubbed "leit-harmony". The idea of leit-harmony was likely introduced to the composer through Rimsky-Korsakov's operas The Golden Cockerel (1907) and Kashchey the Deathless (1902). In these works, mortal elements were associated with the diatonic scales while supernatural elements were associated with the chromatic scale. For example, Stravinsky describes Koschei's leit-harmony as consisting of "Magic Thirds"; the harmony begins with a major or minor third, and the lower voice ascends a tritone while the higher voice descends a half step. The title character's leit-harmony uses a chromatic descent of the first four notes of the introduction, then reversing those notes, giving the music an "iridescent sheen", as Eric Walter White described it.

Stravinsky wrote that The Firebird may be the first appearance of "metrical irregularity" in his music. The passage is marked 7/4, with barlines dividing measures into sets of one and two. White wrote that the composer's earlier works made use of consistent musical pulses, "which was to be disturbed as little as possible by tempo rubato". Stravinsky remarked that he composed The Firebird in "revolt against Rimsky", and that he "tried to surpass him with ponticello, col legno, flautando, glissando, and fluttertongue effects".

A performance of the full ballet lasts about 45 minutes.

=== Instrumentation ===
The work is scored for a large orchestra with the following instrumentation:

Woodwinds
2 piccolos (2nd doubles 3rd flute)
2 flutes
3 oboes
English horn
3 clarinets in A and B♭ (3rd doubles clarinet in D)
bass clarinet in B♭
3 bassoons (3rd doubles 2nd contrabassoon)
contrabassoon

Brass
4 horns in F
3 trumpets in A and B♭
3 trombones
tuba
3 onstage trumpets
2 onstage tenor Wagner tubas
2 onstage bass Wagner tubas

Percussion
timpani
bass drum
cymbals
triangle
tambourine
tamtam
glockenspiel
xylophone

Keyboards
piano
celesta

Strings
3 harps

first violins
second violins
violas
cellos
double basses

Stravinsky described the orchestra as "wastefully large", but White opined that the orchestration allowed him to use a variety of effects, including horn and trombone glissandi borrowed from Rimsky-Korsakov's parts of Mlada (1872).

=== Structure ===
French Episode Titles	English Episode Titles
Introduction	Introduction
First tableau
Le Jardin enchanté de Kastchei	Koschei's Enchanted Garden
Apparition de l'Oiseau de feu, poursuivi par Ivan Tsarevitch	Appearance of the Firebird pursued by Ivan Tsarevich
Danse de l'Oiseau de feu	Dance of the Firebird
Capture de l'Oiseau de feu par Ivan Tsarévitch	Ivan Tsarevich Captures the Firebird
Supplications de l'Oiseau de feu	Supplication of the Firebird
Apparition des treize princesses enchantées	Appearance of the Thirteen Enchanted Princesses
Jeu des princesses avec les pommes d'or	The Princesses' Game with the Golden Apples
Brusque apparition d'Ivan Tsarevitch	Sudden Appearance of Ivan Tsarevich
Corovod (Ronde) des princesses	The Princesses' Khorovod (Round Dance)
Lever du jour	Daybreak
Carillon Féérique, apparition des monstres-gardiens de Kastchei et capture d'Ivan Tsarevitch	Magic Carillon; Appearance of Koschei's Guardian Monsters; Capture of Prince Ivan
Arrivée de Kastchei l'Immortel – Dialogue de Kastchei avec Ivan Tsarévitch – Intercession des princesses	Arrival of Koschei the Immortal; His Dialogue with Ivan Tsarevich; Intercession of the Princesses
Apparition de l'Oiseau de feu	Appearance of the Firebird
Danse de la suite de Kastchei, enchantée par l'Oiseau de feu	Dance of Koschei's Retinue under the Firebird's Spell
Danse infernale de tous les sujets de Kastchei	Infernal Dance of All Koschei's Subjects
Berceuse (L'Oiseau de feu)	Lullaby (Firebird)
Reveil de Kastchei – Mort de Kastchei – Profond ténèbres	Koschei's Awakening; Koschei's Death; Profound Darkness
Second tableau
Disparition du palais et des sortilèges de Kastchei, animation des chevaliers petrifiés, allegresse génerale	Disappearance of the Palace and Dissolution of Koschei's Enchantments; Animation of the Petrified Warriors; General Thanksgiving

=== Music and plot ===
The Firebird opens with a slow introduction describing Koschei's enchanted garden, underlined by the low strings presenting the basis of the Firebird's leit-harmony. In the garden are Koschei's enemies petrified into statues. Crescendo and decrescendo phrases in the strings and woodwinds indicate the entrance of the Firebird, being pursued by Prince Ivan. The Firebird's capture by Ivan is depicted with sforzando chords in the horns, and exotic melodies in the oboe, English horn, and viola play as she begs to be released. After the Firebird is freed, Ivan takes one of her feathers, and thirteen enchanted princesses (all captives of Koschei) enter the garden to play a catching game. Ivan introduces himself to the youngest princess, with whom he has fallen in love, and they perform a slow khorovod. The melody for the khorovod is taken from a Russian folk song that Rimsky-Korsakov used in his Sinfonietta on Russian Themes (1879). Offstage trumpets call the princesses back into the palace, but when Ivan pursues them, bells ring out and Koschei appears in front of the gates, signaled by roars in the timpani and bass drum.

"Infernal Dance"
United States Marine Band, arrangement by Thomas Knox

Before Koschei can turn Ivan into stone, the prince summons the Firebird with the feather, and she enchants Koschei and his subjects and begins the famous "Infernal Dance". Another Rimsky-Korsakov reference, the melody is borrowed from Rimsky-Korsakov's parts of Mlada, adding syncopation and startling strikes throughout the theme. As the dance winds down with very loud brass glissandos, Koschei and his subjects fall asleep from exhaustion. The bassoon introduces the Firebird's tranquil lullaby. Ivan is instructed to destroy the egg that holds Koschei's soul. The music jostles around as Ivan tosses the egg from hand to hand.

When Ivan crushes the egg, Koschei dies and the scene is surrounded in "Profound Darkness" while his subjects and enemies are freed from their enchantments. The finale opens with a solo horn announcing the break of dawn, another theme borrowed from Rimsky-Korsakov. The theme grows in the orchestra, building into a triumphant celebration among the freed subjects ending in a brass fanfare.

== Suites ==
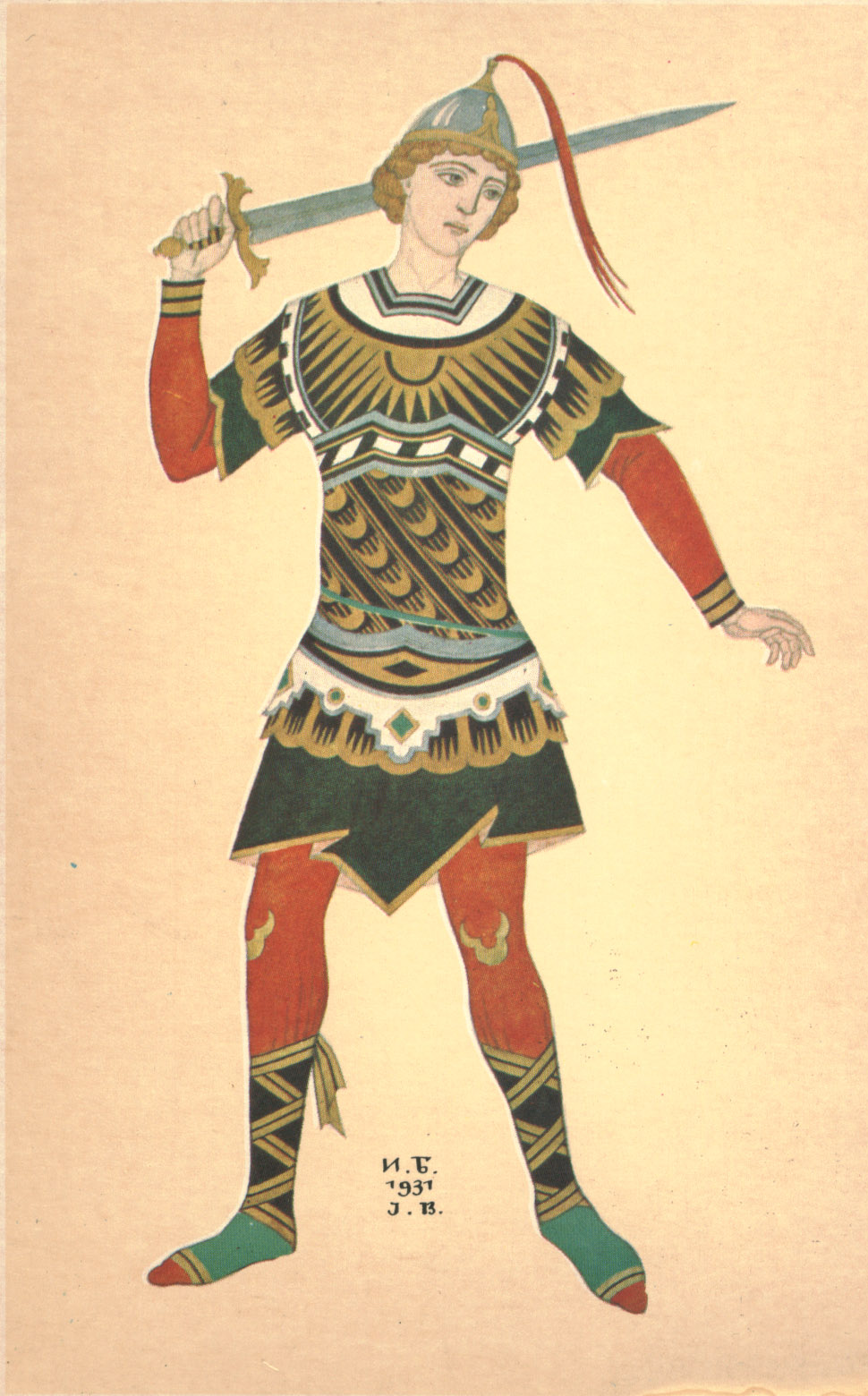
Ivan Bilibin. A warrior – costume design for a 1931 performance

Shortly after the completion of The Firebird, Stravinsky wrote a piano solo reduction of the whole ballet. The composer later arranged three suites for concert performance, dated 1911, 1919, and 1945.

=== 1911 suite ===
1. Introduction – Koschei's Enchanted Garden – Dance of the Firebird
2. Supplication of the Firebird
3. The Princesses' Game with Golden Apples
4. The Princesses' Khorovod
5. Infernal Dance of all Koschei's Subjects

The first suite, titled "suite tirée du conte dansé 'L'oiseau de feu'", was composed in 1911 and published by P. Jurgenson the following year. The instrumentation is essentially the same as that of the ballet. The score was printed from the same plates; only the new endings for the movements were newly engraved. A performance of the 1911 suite lasts about 21 minutes.

=== 1919 suite ===
1. Introduction
2. The Firebird and its Dance
3. Variation of the Firebird
4. The Princesses' Khorovod (Rondo)
5. Infernal Dance of King Kashchei
6. Lullaby
7. Finale

This suite was composed in Morges, Switzerland, for a smaller orchestra. Walsh alleged the suite was composed to re-copyright the work, as Stravinsky sold the new suite to his publisher J. & W. Chester, despite the original ballet still being in copyright. The score contained many errors; Stravinsky wrote in 1952 that "the parts of the 1919 version were in such poor condition and so full of mistakes". Regardless, the 1919 suite remains the most popular today. A performance of the 1919 suite lasts about 26 minutes.

=== 1945 suite ===
1. Introduction – Prelude and Dance of the Firebird – Variations (Firebird)
2. Pantomime I
3. Pas de deux: Firebird and Ivan Tsarevich
4. Pantomime II
5. Scherzo: Dance of the Princesses
6. Pantomime III
7. Rondo (Khorovod)
8. Infernal Dance
9. Lullaby (Firebird)
10. Final Hymn

In 1945, shortly before he acquired American citizenship, Stravinsky was contacted by Leeds Music with a proposal to revise the orchestration of his first three ballets to recopyright them in the United States. The composer agreed and fashioned a new suite based on the 1919 version, adding to it and reorchestrating several minutes of the pantomimes from the original score. The only instrumentation change was the addition of a snare drum. A performance of the 1945 suite lasts about 28 minutes.

== Recordings ==
Stravinsky received several commissions to transcribe his works for player pianos, some from the London Aeolian Company and some from the Paris Pleyel Company. In 1928, the Aeolian Company published an "Audiographic" piano roll of The Firebird, containing both the piano reduction and comments on the work by Stravinsky. The composer identified many of the leit-harmonies in the opening comments of the roll, providing an invaluable resource for information on the ballet.

The first orchestral recording of The Firebird was released by Columbia Records in 1928 with Stravinsky conducting L'Orchestre des Concerts Straram. The 78 rpm record consisted of the 1911 suite with the Lullaby and Finale from the 1919 suite, as well as a recording of The Rite of Spring. In 1933, Stravinsky and the violinist Samuel Dushkin recorded a reduction of the "Scherzo" and "Lullaby" for His Master's Voice. Stravinsky recorded the 1945 suite with the Philharmonic Symphony Orchestra of New York in 1946, and the complete ballet with the Columbia Symphony Orchestra in 1961. A film version of the Sadler's Wells Ballet revival was made in 1959, with Margot Fonteyn in the lead role. A production by the Dance Theater of Harlem with Stephanie Dabney in the lead was filmed for television in 1982.

== Notes and references ==
=== Sources ===
- Anderson, Zoë (2015). "The Firebird (L'Oiseau de feu)". The Ballet Lover's Companion. New Haven: Yale University Press. pp. 82–85. ISBN 978-0-300-15428-3.
- Au, Susan (1998). "Firebird, The". In Cohen, Selma Jeanne (ed.). International Encyclopedia of Dance. Vol. 3. New York: Oxford University Press. pp. 1–4. ISBN 978-0-19-517587-5.
- Balanchine, George; Mason, Francis (1977). "Firebird". Balanchine's Complete Stories of the Great Ballets. Garden City: Doubleday. pp. 237–244. ISBN 978-0-385-11381-6.
- Bazayev, Inessa (2020). "Stravinsky's Sphere of Influence: Paris and Beyond". In Griffiths, Graham (ed.). Stravinsky in Context. Cambridge: Cambridge University Press. pp. 109–116. doi:10.1017/9781108381086.016. ISBN 978-1-108-38108-6. S2CID 229402254.
- Beaumont, Cyril W. (1981). Michel Fokine and His Ballets. New York: Dance Horizons. ISBN 978-0-87127-120-4.
- Bowlt, John E. (2020). "Sergei Diaghilev and Stravinsky: From World of Art to Ballets Russes". In Griffiths, Graham (ed.). Stravinsky in Context. Cambridge: Cambridge University Press. pp. 61–70. doi:10.1017/9781108381086.010. ISBN 978-1-108-38108-6. S2CID 229417098.
- Brooks, Jeffrey (2019). "The Performing Arts: Diaghilev's Ballets Russes". The Firebird and the Fox: Russian Culture under Tsars and Bolsheviks. Cambridge: Cambridge University Press. pp. 125–146. ISBN 978-1-108-69589-3.
- Caddy, Davinia (2020). "Paris and the Belle Époque". In Griffiths, Graham (ed.). Stravinsky in Context. Cambridge: Cambridge University Press. pp. 71–79. doi:10.1017/9781108381086.011. ISBN 978-1-108-38108-6. S2CID 229424313.
- Carbonneau, Suzanne (1998). "Fokine, Michel". In Cohen, Selma Jeanne (ed.). International Encyclopedia of Dance. Vol. 3. New York: Oxford University Press. pp. 14–28. ISBN 978-0-19-517587-5.
- Craft, Robert (1993). Stravinsky: Glimpses of a Life. New York: St. Martin's Press. ISBN 9780312088965.
- Garafola, Lynn (1989). Diaghilev's Ballets Russes. New York: Oxford University Press. ISBN 978-0-306-80878-4.
- Griffiths, Graham (2020). "Stravinsky's Spain: Fan or Mirror?". In Griffiths, Graham (ed.). Stravinsky in Context. Cambridge: Cambridge University Press. pp. 90–97. doi:10.1017/9781108381086.013. ISBN 978-1-108-38108-6. S2CID 229417916.
- Hamilton, David (1972). "Igor Stravinsky: A Discography of the Composer's Performances". In Boretz, Benjamin; Cone, Edward T. (eds.). Perspectives on Schoenberg and Stravinsky (Revised ed.). New York: W. W. Norton. pp. 268–284. ISBN 978-0-393-00618-6.
- McFarland, Mark (1994). "'Leit-Harmony', or Stravinsky's Musical Characterization in 'The Firebird'". International Journal of Musicology. 3. Peter Lang: 203–33. JSTOR 24618812.
- Nelson, Karen (Fall 1984). "Bringing Fokine to Light". Dance Research Journal. 16 (2). Cambridge University Press: 3–12. doi:10.2307/1478716. JSTOR 1478716. S2CID 190676916.
- Philip, Robert (2018). "Igor Stravinsky (1882–1971)". The Classical Music Lover's Companion to Orchestral Music. New Haven: Yale University Press. pp. 774–802. ISBN 978-0-300-24272-0.
- Pople, Anthony (2003). "Early Stravinsky". In Cross, Jonathan (ed.). The Cambridge Companion to Stravinsky. Cambridge Companions to Music. Cambridge: Cambridge University Press. pp. 57–78. ISBN 978-0-511-99889-8.
- Stravinsky, Igor (1962). An Autobiography. New York: W. W. Norton.
- Stravinsky, Igor; Craft, Robert (1962). Expositions and Developments. Berkeley: University of California Press. OCLC 1224278833.
- Taruskin, Richard (1996). Stravinsky and the Russian Traditions: A Biography of the Works Through Mavra. Berkeley: University of California Press. ISBN 978-0-520-07099-8.
- Walsh, Stephen (1999). Stravinsky: A Creative Spring: Russia and France, 1882-1934. New York: Alfred A. Knopf. ISBN 978-0-679-41484-1.
- Walsh, Stephen (2001). "Stravinsky, Igor". Grove Music Online. Oxford University Press. doi:10.1093/gmo/9781561592630.article.52818. ISBN 978-1-56159-263-0. (subscription, Wikilibrary access, or UK public library membership required)
- Walsh, Stephen (2006). Stravinsky: The Second Exile (France and America, 1934–1971). New York: Alfred A. Knopf. ISBN 0-375-40752-9.
- White, Eric Walter (1957). "Stravinsky". In Hartog, Howard (ed.). European Music in the Twentieth Century. London: Pelican Books. pp. 49–71. OCLC 1336434.
- White, Eric Walter (1979). Stravinsky, The Composer and his Works (2nd ed.). Berkeley: University of California Press. ISBN 978-0-520-03983-4.
