= Ivan the Fool =

Russian folk character

Ivan the Fool (Russian: Иван-дурак, romanized: Ivan-durak, hypocoristic: Иванушка-дурачок, Ivanushka-durachok), also called Ivan the Ninny, is a lucky fool stock character who appears in Russian folklore, a very simple-minded, but, nevertheless, lucky young man.

== Character ==
Ivan the Fool usually appears in stories either as a peasant or as the son of a poor family. He is usually the youngest of three brothers; his older siblings appear much smarter than he, but are sometimes unkind to and envious of him.

In contrast to typical heroes, Ivan's simplicity and lack of guile turn out to help him in his adventures. For example, he listens to his heart rather than to his mind, and he easily forgets offence and endeavors to help others even at his own expense. His naivety, kindness, and daring help him fight villains, make friends, and win princesses' hearts, and ultimately he is rewarded with half a kingdom or some similar accomplishment.

The moral of these stories is that Ivan the Fool is rarely the fool, but is merely perceived as such by others owing to his simple nature and joviality.

Andrey Sinyavsky remarks that Ivan the Fool is a positive character in all tales which mention him.

== Occurrences ==
- Sivko-Burko and The Little Humpbacked Horse, Russian literary fairy tales with Ivan the Fool as the main character
- How Ivanushka the Fool Travelled in Search of Wonder, a Soviet fantasy film
- Ivan the Fool (opera)
- Ivan the Fool, a short story by Leo Tolstoy (1886)
- Upon the Magic Roads, 2021 Russian animated film based on various elements from Russian fairy tales

== See also ==
- Hloupý Honza (Stupid Honza), Czech counterpart
- Foolishness for Christ
- Ivan Tsarevich
- Jack (hero)
