= The Little Humpbacked Horse =

Russian fairy tale

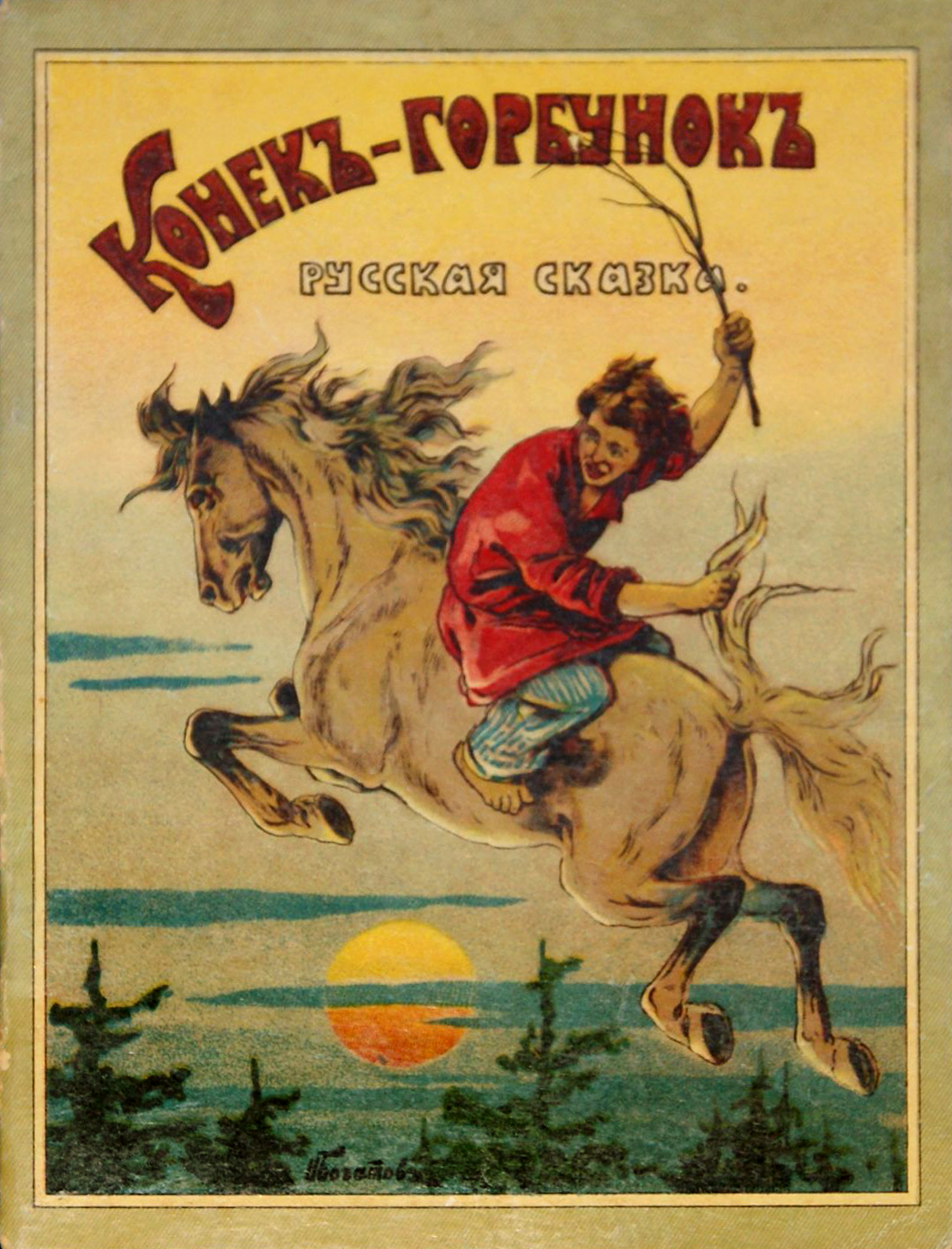
- A 1914 edition cover
- Author: Pyotr Yershov
- Original title: Конёк-Горбуно́к
- Language: Russian (translated in many languages)
- Genre: literary fairy tale in verse
- Publication date: 1834 (first book print)

The Little Humpbacked Horse (Note: The title The Little Humpbacked Horse was used in translations by Elizabeth Winthrop , Margaret Hodges and others. Other translations (used for various adaptations) include The Magic Horse, The magic Pony, or The Little Magic Horse) (Russian: Конёк-Горбуно́к, romanized: Konyok-Gorbunok) is a Russian literary fairy tale in verse by Pyotr Yershov written in 1830s and first published in 1834. Its protagonist is Ivan the Fool with his magical helper, little humpback horse.

It has become a Russian literary classic. Until 1917, the tale was reprinted 26 times, in the USSR it went through more than 130 editions.

The tale is a version of the Golden-Maned Steed fairy-tale motif, about a horse with wondrous abilities. The plot of this story uses a combination of several motifs used in a number of folktales, such as Tsarevitch Ivan, the Fire Bird and the Gray Wolf (a tale classified in the Aarne-Thompson-Uther Index as type ATU 550, "Bird, Horse and Princess") and some others. The East Slavic Folktale Catalogue classifies the motif of the poem with the eponymous type СУС 531, "Конёк-Горбунок", of

== Plot ==
A peasant had three sons: smart, not so smart, and the silly one, Ivan the Fool. Someone starts trampling their wheat crops at nights. The older brothers got lazy, but Ivan catches the culprit: a white mare with the golden mane. She promises to bring three foals for Ivan, two for sale and a small one, but with magic powers, to keep. On the way to the capital, to sell the horses to the tsar Ivan picks up a feather of the firebird. Tsar learns about the feather and wants the firebird for himself.The little humpbacked horse helps Ivan to carry out this and other many unreasonable demands of the tsar. During his adventures, Ivan captures the firebird for the tsar, keeps his magic horse, and finds his love, Tsar-Maiden, and they live happily ever after together.

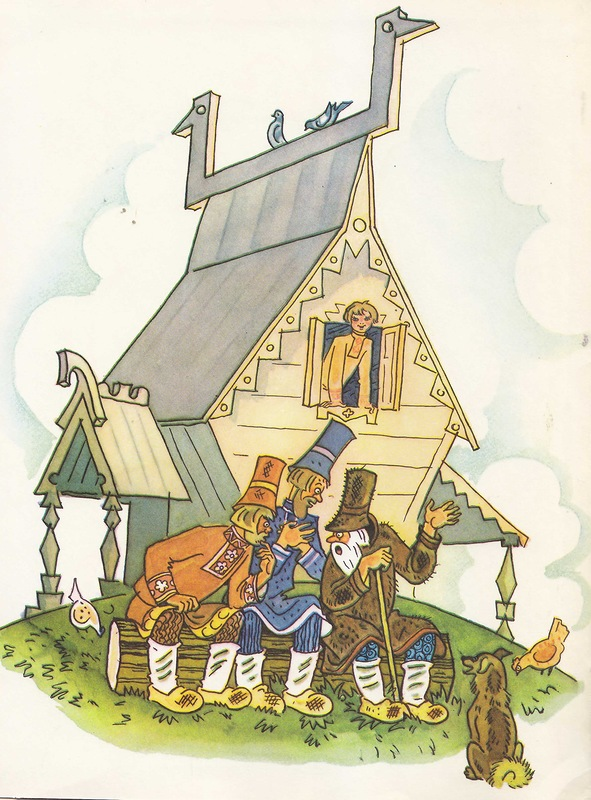
Father and his three sons

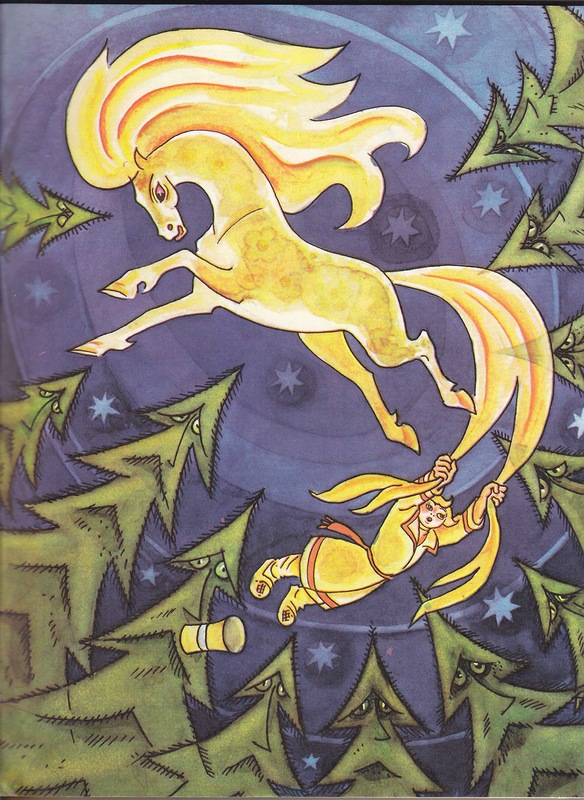
Ivan catches the mare

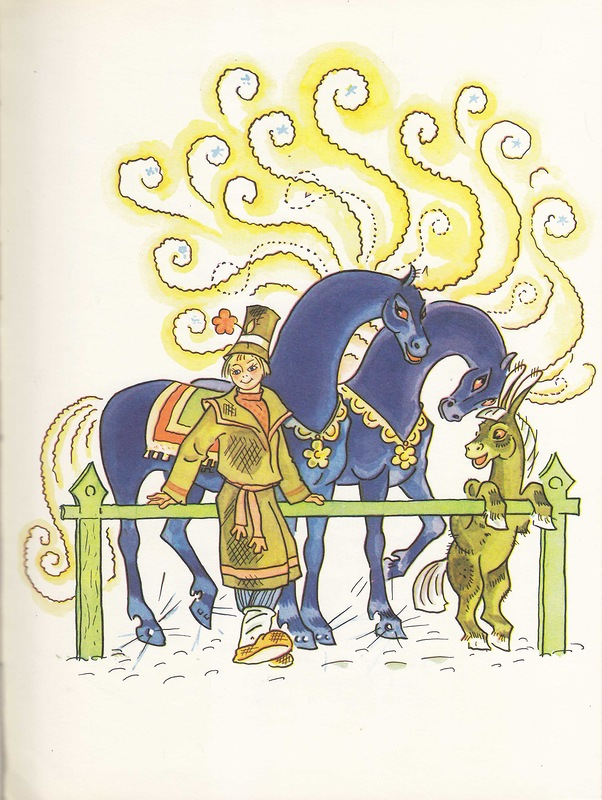
Ivan and his horses

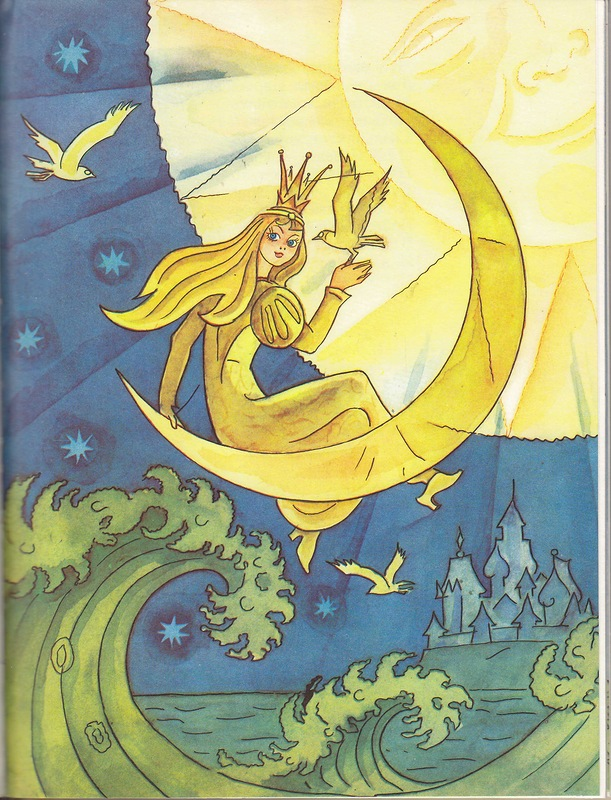
Tsar-Maiden

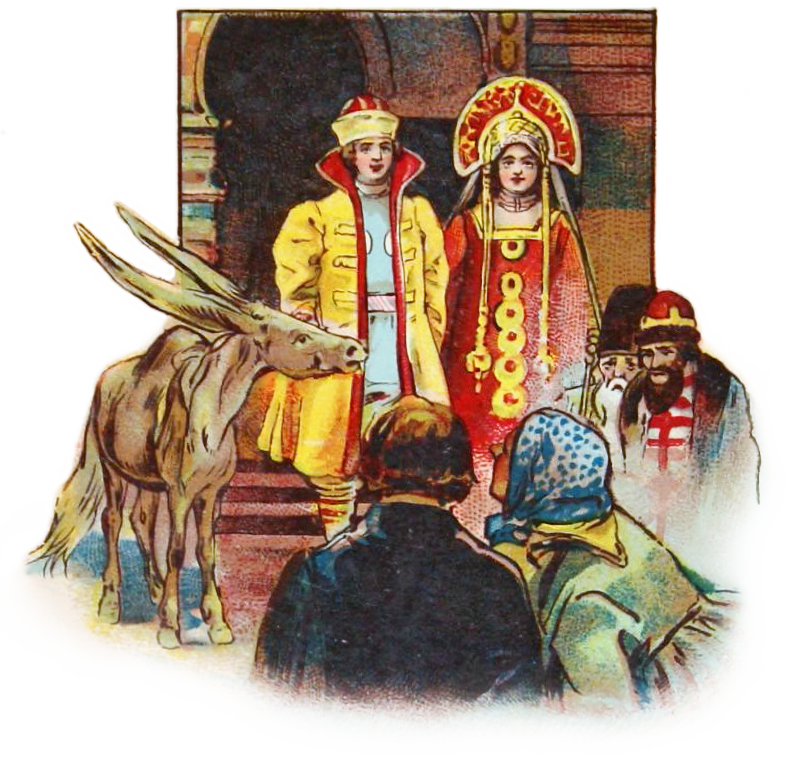
Wedding of Ivan and Tsar-Maiden
