= The Little Humpbacked Horse (1941 film) =

- Directed by: Aleksandr Rou
- Written by: Vladimir Shveitser
- Starring: Pyotr Aleynikov; Marina Kovalyova; Veniamin Gut; Georgy Millyar
- Cinematography: Bentsion Monastyrsky
- Music by: Leonid Polovinkin
- Production company: Soyuzdetfilm
- Release date: 1941
- Running time: 76 min
- Country: Soviet Union
- Language: Russian

The Little Humpbacked Horse (Russian: Конёк-Горбунок, romanized: Konyok-Gorbunok) is a 1941 Soviet fantasy film directed by Alexander Rou and produced at Soyuzdetfilm studios. It is based on a fairy tale by Pyotr Pavlovich Yershov.

== Plot ==
A father sends his three sons Danila, Gavrila and Ivanushka to tend their fields. Suddenly a white horse appears who, after Ivanushka mounts him, begins to speak and promises him three horses. After a wild ride through the field, the white horse throws it off and disappears. But the boy retains a strange feather from the event, which comes from the plumage of the firebird.

The next morning Danila and Gavrila watch their brother leave and lock up the stable. They sneak in secretly, see two beautiful horses in it and steal them immediately. When Ivan notices the theft, he is shocked, the remaining third horse, small and inconspicuous and ignored by the brothers, encourages him, however, and goes in pursuit with him.

Meanwhile, there is a fair in town. The tsar sees the stolen horses here and wants to buy them from the brothers. Ivan joins them, reveals himself to be the real owner and sells the animals, but leaves the gold to Danila and Gawrila. The sold horses wriggle away from Tschichir, the tsar's stable master, and pass through, Ivan can catch them again. For this purpose, Tschichir's office is assigned to him.

The former stable master, driven by jealousy, notices that Ivan has a firebird's feather and reveals it to the tsar. He wants to take possession of the wondrous animal and sends Iwan out. After he was able to flee from a band of robbers thanks to the horse, they reached the sea, where a huge whale devoured Ivan and with him several boats. The boy falls under the power of the sea tsar, but is able to free himself and also makes the whale spit out the boats again. On one of them he sees the beautiful Sarja-Sarjaniza and takes her to the court. The tsar wants to marry the beautiful woman, but she initially refuses to marry the monarch. Finally, she agrees on the condition that the tsar should bathe in boiling hot milk in the castle courtyard in order to become young again. He forces Ivan to take the sample first. The miracle horse steps in again and lets him step out of the kettle as a beautiful young man in a noble robe. The Tsar now jumps in himself and is killed in the process. The servants and soldiers present diverge and the wonder horse chases the former stable master away. The gates of the palace are opened and the whole people enjoy the treasures.

In the end Ivanuschka and Sarja get married, the horse takes pride of place at the wedding table.

== Cast ==
- Pyotr Aleynikov - Ivanushka
- Georgy Vinogradov - Ivanushka (songs)
- Marina Kovalyova - Zarya-Zaryanitsa
- Veniamin Gut - King Afron
- Georgy Millyar - Chikhir
- Lev Potyomkin - Tsap-Tsarap
- Mikhail Troyanovsky - Starinushka
- Aleksandr Zhukov - Danila
- Nikolai Gorlov - Gavrila
- Aleksandr Timontayev - King of the sea
- Ninel Urusova - Housekeeper Domnushka
