= Pyotr Pavlovich Yershov =

Russian poet (1815–1869)

- Пётр Па́влович Ершо́в
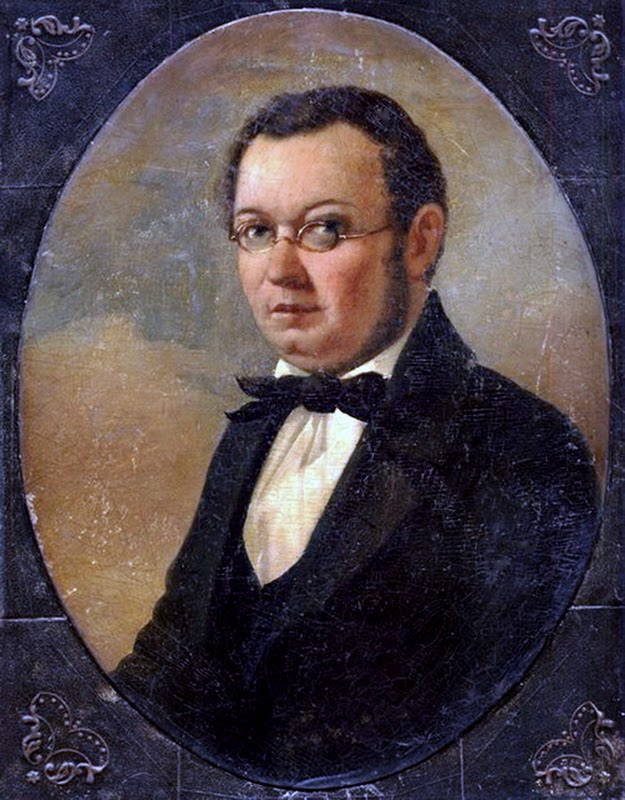
- Portrait by Nikolay Madzhi (Maggi) (late 1850s)
- Born: 6 March 1815; Bezrukovo, Tobolsk Governorate
- Died: 30 August 1869 (aged 54)
- Occupations: Poet and author

Pyotr Pavlovich Yershov (Russian: Пётр Па́влович Ершо́в; 6 March [O.S. 22 February] 1815 – 30 August [O.S. 18 August] 1869) was a Russian poet and author of the fairy-tale poem The Little Humpbacked Horse (Konyok-Gorbunok).

== Biography ==
Pyotr Yershov was born in the village of Bezrukovo, Tobolsk Governorate (currently Ishimsky District, Tyumen Oblast). During his childhood he lived in the town of Beryozov. From 1827 to 1831, he studied in Tobolsk gymnasium, where he reportedly created a society for the ethnographic study of Siberia and even planned to publish their own scientific journal. From 1831 to 1836, Yershov studied philosophy at Saint Petersburg University, which was where, at the age of 19, he wrote his masterpiece, the fairy-tale poem The Little Humpbacked Horse.

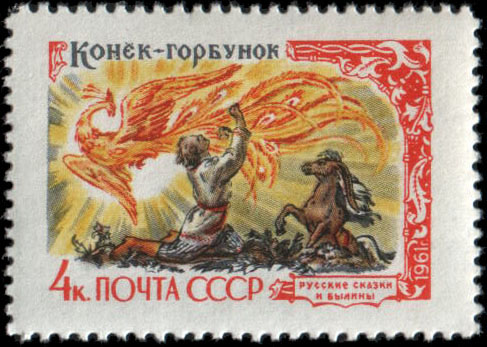
The Little Humpbacked Horse on a 1961 stamp.

A large extract from it was published in 1834 and brought Yershov instant fame. Alexander Pushkin wrote that Yershov was as fully in command of his verses as a landowner is in command of his serfs. Pushkin also announced that he would stop writing fairy tales as Yershov did it much better. Nonetheless, Pushkin did write The Tale of the Fisherman and the Fish one year after this announcement.

In 1836, Yershov returned to Tobolsk, where he worked as a teacher at the Tobolsk gymnasium. He became the principal of the school in 1858.

Yershov published many lyrical verses, a drama called Suvorov and a Station Master, and several short stories, but none of these had the same success as The Humpbacked Horse. He also reportedly wrote a large fairy-tale poem called Ilya Muromets, and a huge poem called Ivan Tsarevitch in ten volumes and one hundred songs, but subsequently destroyed them. Only a short extract from Ivan Tsarevitch survived.

Yershov died in 1869 in Tobolsk. His biographers note that disasters frequented his life. In 1834, just after the triumph of The Humpbacked Horse, both Pyotr's father and brother died within a few days. In 1838, his mother died; in 1845, his wife died; in 1847, he married again, but his second wife died in 1852. Of his 15 children only six survived.

== Relation to the Mendeleev family ==
When brothers Pyotr and Nikolai Yershov came to the Tobol grammar school, the principal of the school was Ivan Pavlovich Mendeleev, the father of the scientist Dmitri Ivanovich Mendeleev. When Pyotr Yershov returned from St. Petersburg to Tobolsk as a poet in 1835, Ivan Pavlovich Mendeleev lost his sight and his family lived on the production of a small glassworks run by Marie Dmitrijevna Mendeleev. At that time, the role changed and Ivan Mendeleev's pupil became the teacher of his last children. Marie Dmitrijevna owned the largest library in Tobolsk, and Yershov soon became close to his teacher's family. It was he who arranged for the Mendeleev's youngest son, Dmitri Ivanovich Mendeleev, to enter the grammar school together with his brother Paul, who was two years older. As the director of the grammar school, he enabled Dmitri to graduate two years earlier. This allowed Marie Dmitrijevna to go to St. Petersburg with the talented Dmitri for the last money left after the glassworks fire and have him enrolled to study at the Main Pedagogical Institute. In return, Dmitri Ivanovich Mendeleev, who had already made a living in St. Petersburg after graduation, helped his teacher Yershov with the reprint of The Little Humpbacked Horse after the release of censorship.

In 1862, Pyotr Pavlovich Yershov became the father-in-law of Dmitri Ivanovich Mendeleev, when he married Dmitrije's stepdaughter from his first marriage, Feozva Nikitichna Leshcheva. The help that Yershov provided to the Mendeleev family in Tobolsk during the most difficult times could already be repaid by Professor Mendeleev by supporting his wife's family. Pyotr Yershov did not learn about the divorce, he died in 1869 during a happy relationship.

== The Little Humpbacked Horse ==
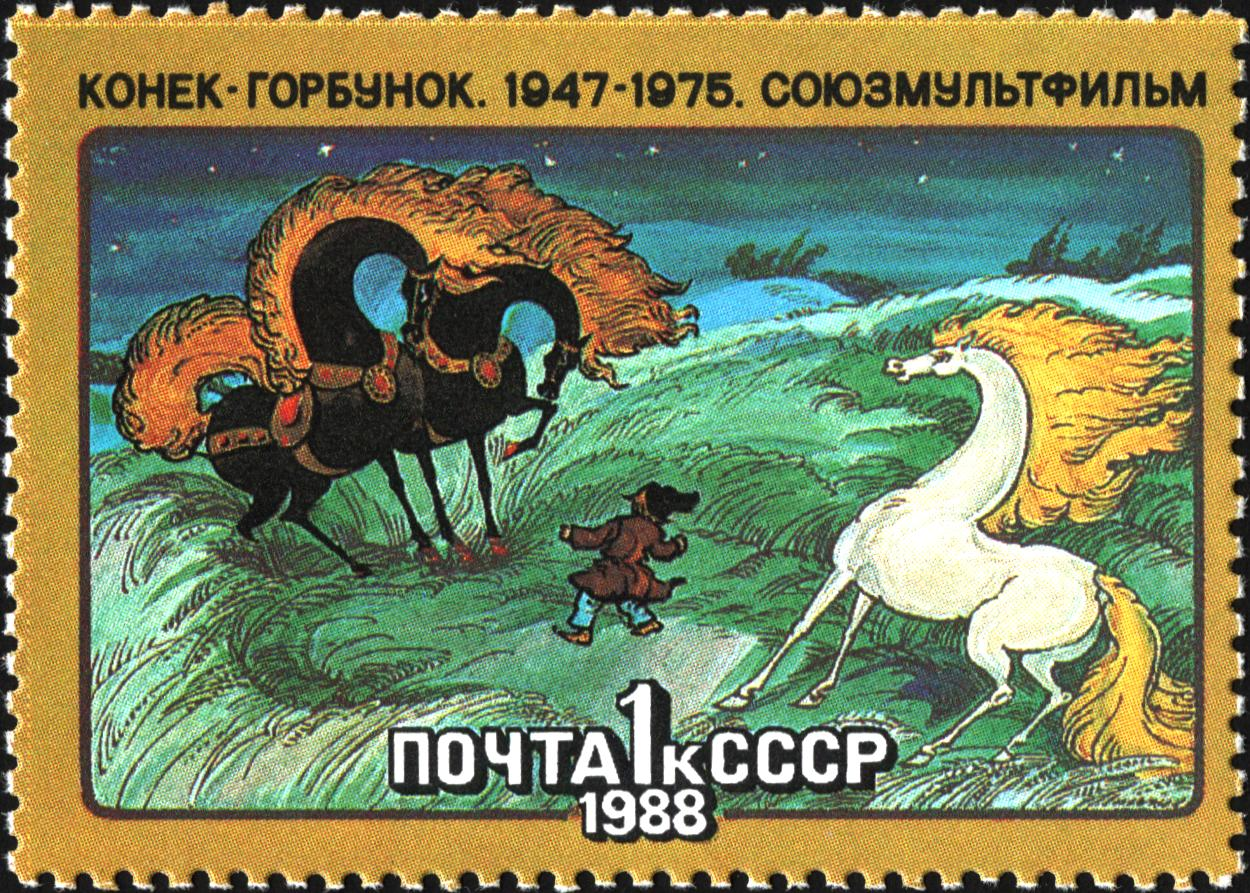
Soviet stamp (1988) based on the 1975 animated film.

The Little Humpbacked Horse (Konyok-Gorbunok), sometimes known in English as The Magic Horse or The Little Magic Horse, is a version of the Golden-Maned Steed fairy-tale character type, with wondrous abilities (e.g., flying). Some scholars see that a large part of the plot of this story is based on Tsarevitch Ivan, the Fire Bird and the Gray Wolf (a tale classified in the Aarne-Thompson-Uther Index as type ATU 550, "Bird, Horse and Princess"). The East Slavic Folktale Catalogue classifies the motif of the poem with the eponymous type СУС 531, "Конёк-Горбунок", of

The Little Humpbacked Horse helps Ivan the Fool, a peasant's son, to carry out many unreasonable demands of the Tsar. During his adventures, Ivan captures the beautiful magic firebird for the tsar, keeps his magic horse, and finds his love, Tsar-Maiden, and they live happily ever after together.

Censors banned the complete story for over 20 years in the mid-19th century because it made the Tsar appear foolish. Until 1856, the tale was published with dots representing omitted verses and songs in many sections. The tale is meant to be a satire on the absurdities of Russian feudal and bureaucratic life at the time.

The poem became very popular in the Soviet Union and there are numerous editions and adaptations. Today it is considered a classic children's fairy tale.
