= Firebird (Slavic folklore) =

Magical glowing bird in Slavic folklore

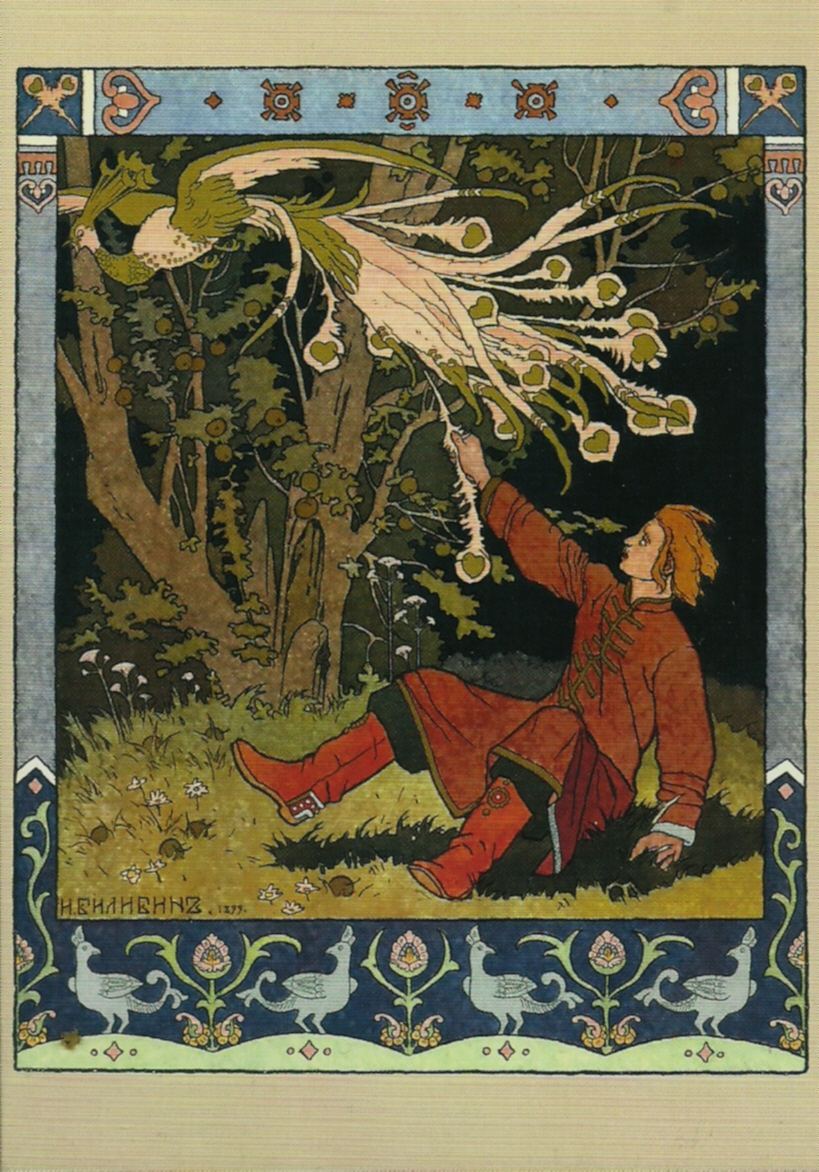
Ivan Bilibin's illustration to a Russian fairy tale about the Firebird, 1899

In Slavic mythology and folklore, the firebird (Note: Russian: жар-пти́ца, romanized: zhar-ptitsa Ukrainian: жар-пти́ця, zhar-ptytsia Serbo-Croatian: žar-ptica, жар-птица Bulgarian: Жар-птица, romanized: Zhar-ptitsa Macedonian: Жар-птица, romanized: Žar-ptica Polish: Żar-ptak, rarely also ptak-żar Czech: Pták Ohnivák Slovak: Vták Ohnivák Slovene: Rajska/zlata-ptica) is a magical and prophetic glowing or burning bird from a faraway land which is both a blessing and a harbinger of doom to its captor.

== Description ==
The Firebird is described in one of the texts collected by Alexander Afanasyev as having "golden feathers, while its eyes were like unto oriental crystal". Other sources portray a large bird with majestic plumage that glows brightly emitting red, orange, and yellow light, like a bonfire that is just past the turbulent flame. The feathers do not cease glowing if removed, and one feather can light a large room if not concealed. In later iconography, the form of the Firebird is usually that of a smallish fire-colored falcon, complete with a crest on its head and tail feathers with glowing eyes.

== Fairy tales ==
A typical role of the Firebird in fairy tales is as an object of a difficult quest. The quest is usually initiated by finding a lost tail feather, at which point the hero sets out to find and capture the live bird, sometimes of his own accord, but usually on the bidding of a father or king. The Firebird is a marvel, highly coveted, but the hero, initially charmed by the wonder of the feather, eventually blames it for his troubles.

The Firebird tales follow the classical scheme of fairy tale, with the feather serving as a premonition of a hard journey, with magical helpers met on the way who help in travel and capture of the Bird, and returning from the faraway land with the prize. There are many versions of the Firebird story as it was primarily told orally in the beginning.

=== Ivan Tsarevich and the Grey Wolf ===
Read full article: Tsarevitch Ivan, the Firebird and the Gray Wolf.

=== Suzanne Massie version ===
Suzanne Massie retells another story of the Firebird legend. A modest and gentle orphan girl named Maryushka lives in a small village. People would come from all over to buy her embroidery, and many merchants asked her to come away and work for them. She told them all that she would sell to any who found her work beautiful, but she would never leave the village of her birth. One day the evil sorcerer Kaschei the Immortal heard of Maryushka's beautiful needlework and transformed himself into a beautiful young man and visited her. Upon seeing her ability he became enraged that a mere mortal could produce finer work than he himself possessed. He tried to tempt her by offering to make her Queen if she would embroider for him alone, but she refused saying she never wanted to leave her village. Because of this last insult to his ego he turned Maryushka into a Firebird, and himself into a great black Falcon, picked her up in his talons, and stole her away from her village. To leave a memory of herself with her village forever she shed her feathers onto the land below. As the last feather fell Maryushka died in the falcon's talons. The glowing rainbow feathers were magic and remain undimmed, but show their colors only to those who love beauty and seek to make beauty for others.

=== The Firebird and Princess Vasilisa ===
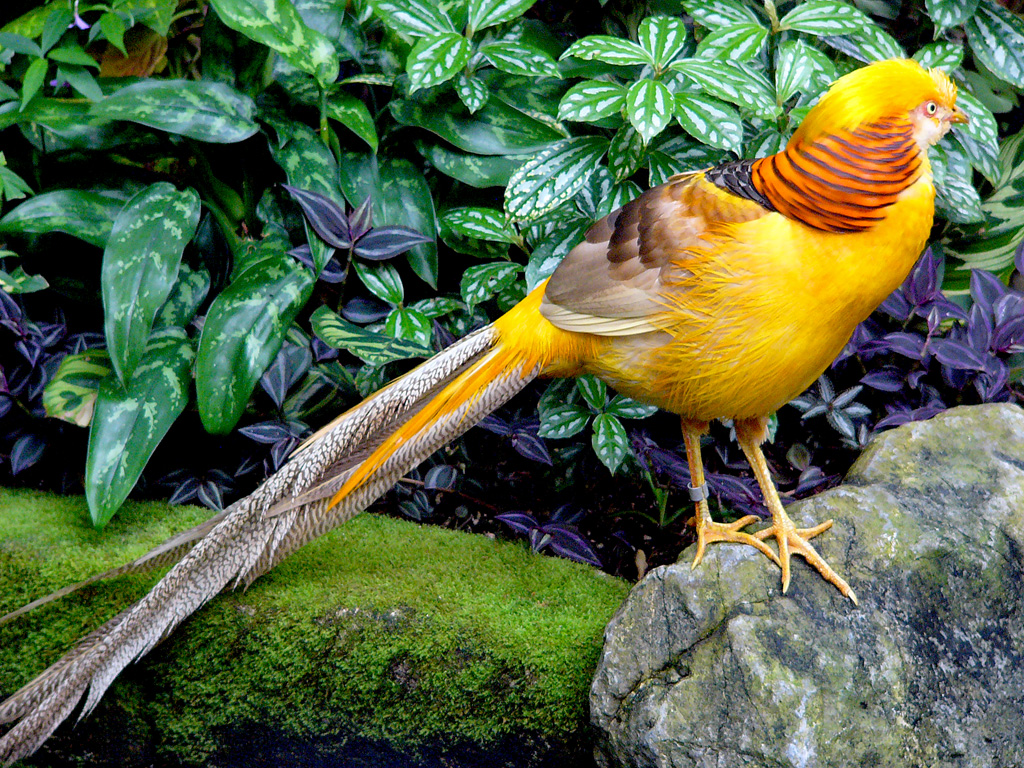
Male golden pheasant at the Bloedel Floral Conservatory, Vancouver.

Irina Zheleytova translates another version, The Firebird and Princess Vasilisa. In this version a king's archer is on a hunt and runs across a firebird's feather. The archer's horse warns the archer not to touch it, as bad things will happen. The archer ignores the advice and takes it to bring back to the king so he will be praised and rewarded. When the king is presented with the feather he demands the entire firebird or the death of the archer. The archer weeps to his horse, who instructs him to put corn on the fields in order to capture the firebird. The firebird comes down to eat, allowing the archer to capture the bird. When the king is presented with the firebird he demands that the archer fetch the Princess Vassilissa so the king may marry her; otherwise, the archer will be killed. The archer goes to the princess' lands and drugs her with wine to bring her back to the king. The king is pleased and rewards the archer; however, when the princess awakes and realizes she is not home she begins to weep. If she is to be married she wants her wedding dress, which is under a rock in the middle of the Blue Sea. Once again the archer weeps to his horse and fulfills his duty to his king and brings back the dress. The princess is stubborn and refuses to marry the king even with her dress until the archer is dipped in boiling water. The archer begs to see his horse before he is boiled and the horse puts a spell on the archer to protect him from the water. The archer comes out more handsome than anyone had ever seen. The king sees this and jumps in as well but is instead boiled alive. The archer is chosen to be king and marries the princess and they live happily ever after.

=== Other versions ===
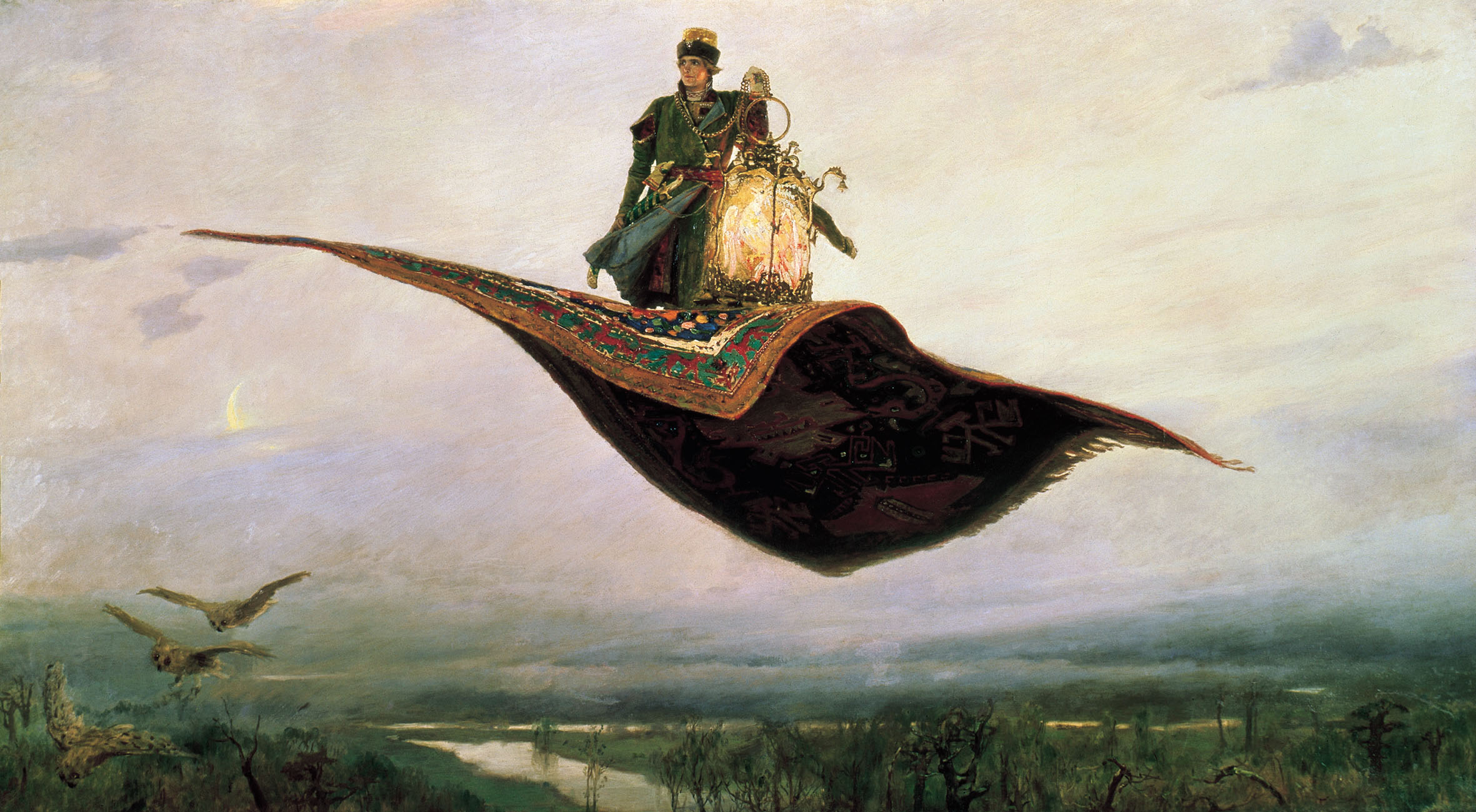
Prince Ivan returning on a magic carpet with the caged firebird.

The Firebird concept has parallels in Iranian legends of magical birds, in the Brothers Grimm fairy tale about The Golden Bird, and related Russian magical birds like the Sirin. The story of the quest itself is closely paralleled by Armenian Hazaran Blbul. In the Armenian tale, however, the bird does not glow, but rather makes the land bloom through its song. In Czech folklore, it is called Pták Ohnivák (Fire-like Bird) and appears, for example, in a Karel Jaromír Erben fairy tale, also as an object of a difficult quest. Moreover, in the beginning of this fairy tale, the bird steals magical golden apples belonging to a king and is therefore pursued by the king's servants in order to protect the precious apples.

The story of the firebird comes in many forms. Some folk tales say that the Firebird is a mystical bird that flies around a king's castle and at night swoops down and eats all the king's golden apples. Others say that the firebird is just a bird that flies around giving hope to those who need it. Some additions to that legend say that when the firebird flies around, his eyes sparkle and pearls fall from his beak. The pearls would then fall to the peasants, giving them something to trade for goods or services. In the most common version of the legend, a Tsar commands his three sons to capture the firebird that keeps flying down from above and eating his apples. The golden apples are in the Tsar's orchard and give youth and strength to all who eat them. The sons end up barely missing the bird, but they catch one of his feathers that glows in the night. They take it to a dark room and it lights the room completely.

== Literary and musical works ==
The story of the Firebird quest has inspired literary works, including "The Little Humpback Horse" by Pyotr Yershov and "These Feathered Flames" by Alexandra Overy.

The most famous version of the Firebird legend was the production by Sergei Diaghilev of Ballet Russe, who commissioned composer Igor Stravinsky to score the enormously popular large-scale ballet called The Firebird. In Stravinsky's ballet, with a scenario written by Michel Fokine and Alexandre Benois, the creature is half-woman, half-bird. She is captured by Prince Ivan, but when he sets her free she gives him a magic feather, which he uses to defeat the spell of Kaschei the Immortal, who had captured thirteen princesses. Prince Ivan then marries the most beautiful of them.

French illustrator Edmund Dulac included a literary version of the legend of the firebird in his book Fairy Tales of the Allied Nations, where the bird is identified as the Firebird and described as "Hausa, the Bird of the Sun".

In popular music, Peter Gabriel made a demo titled "Firebirds", whose flute playing (by Gabriel himself) borrows the melody from another piece by Stravinsky, "The Rite of Passage". This song has never been officially released.

Polish writer Władysław Reymont received the Nobel Prize for his novel Chłopi (The Peasants). The story takes place in late 19th century Congress Poland and follows the everyday life of the peasantry in a typical Polish village. In the tenth chapter of book two, some of the characters gather together to exchange stories and legends, among which are mentioned the firebirds (ptaki-żary).

Katherine Arden's "Winternight trilogy" includes influences from many Russian folktales including those of the Firebird. In the books, the Firebird appears as an immortal shapeshifting mare with a golden coat and red mane.

== See also ==
- Fenghuang – Mythological birds in Sinosphere traditions
- Gagana – Fantastical bird in Russian folklore
- Golden pheasant – Species of bird
- Phoenix (mythology) – Immortal bird that is cyclically reborn
- Phoenix in popular culture – Cultural depictions of the phoenix
- Raróg – Fire demon in Slavic mythology
- Simargl – Deity in East Slavic mythology
- Simurgh – Iranian mythological bird
- Turul – Hungarian mythological bird and national symbol
