= The Maiden Tsar =

Russian fairy tale

The Maiden Tsar (Russian: Царь-девица, romanized: Tsar-devitsa, Tsar-Maiden, Tsar-Maid) is a character in East Slavic folktales. It is best known from Alexander Afanasyev's eight-volume collection Narodnye russkie skazki (1855—1863), folktale "Царь-девица"; variants recorded in Orenburg Governorate (number 232) and Perm Governorate (number 233).

The tale is classified - and gives its name - to tale type SUS 400/2, "Russian: Царь-девица, romanized: Tsar-devitsa, lit. 'Tsar-Maiden'", of the East Slavic Folktale Catalogue (Russian: СУС, romanized: SUS). The East Slavic type corresponds, in the international catalogue of the Aarne-Thompson-Uther Index, to tale type ATU 400, "The Quest for the Lost Wife".

== Synopsis by Afanasyev, 232 ==
The synopsis below follows version 232. In version 233 the protagonist is Vasily Tsarevich, son of tsar and tsarina.

A merchant and his wife have a son who they name Ivan. The mother dies and the merchant puts Ivan in the care of a tutor, meanwhile, he marries again. The stepmother falls in love with Ivan after he comes of age. One day, Ivan and his tutor went to the sea to fish and saw a fleet. The Maiden Tsar and her foster sisters were on board and, seeing Ivan and the tutor floating on a raft, dropped anchor and invited them onto the ship. The Maiden Tsar said she was in love with Ivan and wanted to marry him, to which Ivan agreed. The Maiden Tsar asked him to return the next day, then left.

The stepmother learned of this and became jealous; she ordered the tutor to put a pin inside of Ivan’s tunic, which would put him into a deep sleep that nobody could wake him up from until the pin was removed. For three days, the tutor did this, but the Maiden Tsar figured out the ruse and wrote a letter to Ivan, telling him to cut off the man’s head and find her in the thrice tenth kingdom.

Ivan read the letter and killed the tutor before going off to the find the Maiden Tsar. He found a hut, where Baba Yaga lived, and asked her if she knew the way to the kingdom. The old woman did not know the way, but told him to visit her sister. She, also, did not know the way to the kingdom, but said that her sister might. She warned him to ask her for three horns and blow louder on each of them, or he would be eaten by her.

Ivan reached the youngest sister’s home and begged her to let him blow three horns. A firebird came and took Ivan away from the cannibal and flew him to the thrice tenth kingdom. He met a woman who asked him about his journey. She warned him that the princess did not love him anymore as she took out her heart and put it away. The woman promised to ask her daughter, who worked in the Maiden Tsar’s palace, where it was. The next day, the mother asked her daughter where the heart was, but she did not know and promised she would ask.

When the daughter came back the next day and told her mother where the heart was, Ivan went in search of it. He brought it back to the Maiden Tsar at a party and the two went back to her kingdom and got married.

== Other occurrences ==
The motif was used in a number literary fairy tales and children's poems, e.g., Marina Tsvetaeva's poem (1920), Gavrila Derzhavin's ballad, Vladimir Odoyevsky's children's play, sometimes by title only, e.g., Konstantin Balmont's poem or Vsevolod Solovyov (1878, historical novel)

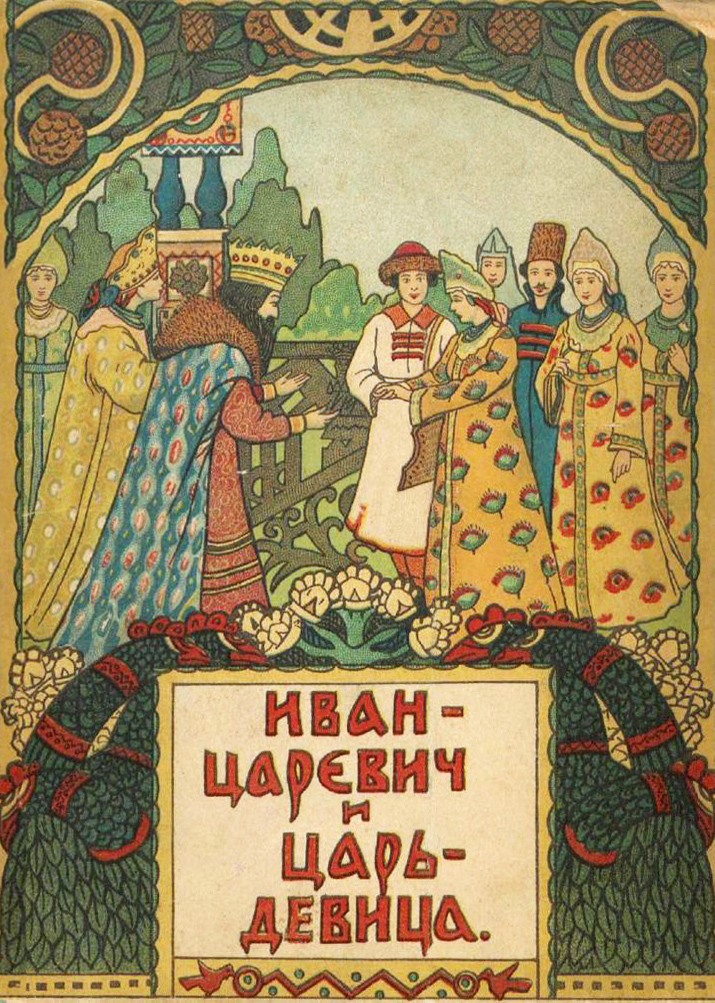
Ivan Tsarevich and Tsar Maiden, I.D.Sytin, 2014

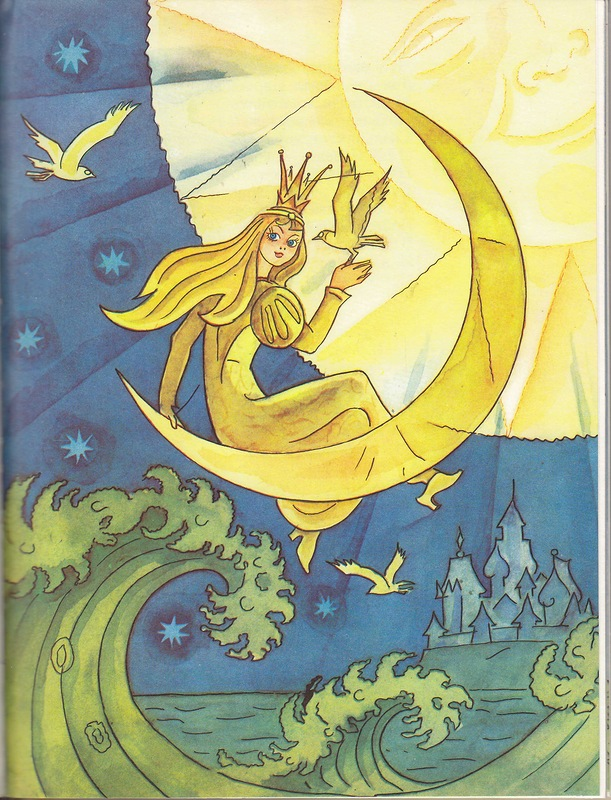
Maiden Tsar from Pyotr Yershov's The Little Humpbacked Horse (Konyok-Gorbunok)

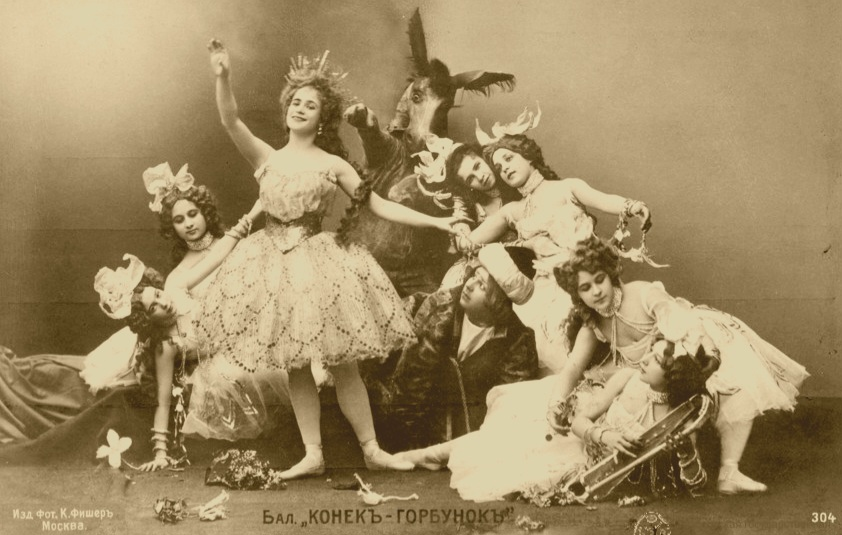
The Little Humpbacked Horse, 1901 revival, Lyubov Roslavleva as the Tsar Maiden (front, standing)

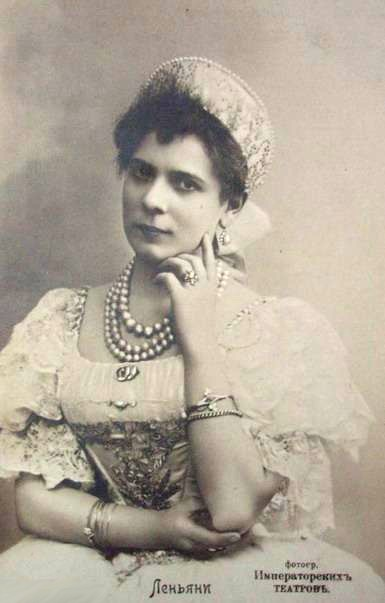
Pierina Legnani as the Tsar Maiden in Marius Petipa's revival of The Little Humpbacked Horse, 1895.

== Translations ==
- Alexander Afanasyev. Russian Fairy Tales. Translated by Norbert Guterman. NY: Pantheon, 1973. 229-234.
