= El Aqriūn =

Palestinian Arab folktale about a boy and his magic horse

El Aqri’ūn

Folk tale
- Name: El Aqri’ūn
- Aarne–Thompson grouping: AaTh 532, "I Don't Know" (The Helpful Horse); ATU 314, "Goldener"
- Region: Arab Abū Kašak, Jaffa
- Published in: La Jrefiyye palestina: literatura, mujer y maravilla: el cuento maravilloso palestino de tradición oral, estudio y textos, by Montserrat Rabadán Carrascosa (2003)

El Aqri’ūn is a Palestinian Arab folktale published by Montserrat Rabadán Carrascosa. It deals with a friendship between a prince and a magic horse that are forced to flee for their lives due to the boy's stepmother, and reach another kingdom, where the boy adopts another identity.

The tale is classified in the international Aarne-Thompson-Uther Index as type ATU 314, "Goldener", with an alternate introductory episode: evil stepmother persecutes hero and his horse. Similar tales are known across the Middle East.

== Source ==
Researcher Montserrat Rabadán Carrascosa collected the tale from informant Fatima Husayn, from Arab Abū Kašak, Jaffa.

== Summary ==
In this tale, a king is childless, so God takes pity on him and grants him a son that grows up to become a handsome youth. One day, he goes on a hunt with his friends, but loses his way during the hunt. His friends try to find him, but soon return to their homes, while the prince takes shelter in a cave. He cooks the game he hunted and finds a pregnant mare foaling a colt with a blue eye and a dark eye. During a moment of distraction, the prince snatches the foal from its mother and brings it home with him. The king is relieved for his son's return, and the prince finds a horsekeeper to look after the foal. The foal becomes a fine horse that only the horsekeeper and the prince can approach. Meanwhile, the prince's mother dies and the king remarries. The new queen fools the king with an acquaintance she brought with her and who she makes the overseer of the royal cooks. The prince dislikes his new stepmother and suspects she might be cheating on the king, but keeps this to himself.

One day, the king tells him the queen has fallen ill and the cook overseer says the remedy is the prince's horse's heart. The prince agrees to the terms, but asks to ride the horse, since he has never done it. He takes the opportunity to ride away from the palace and to another kingdom. He stops the ride in the desert and the animal reminds the prince that the king wants its heart, but the prince reveals that he escaped from his people and for the horse's sake. The horse thanks the prince and gives him some of its hairs which he can rub to summon the equine to help him, then departs. The prince then trades his clothes with a poor man for some coins and buys a stomach from a butcher's shop to use as a cap.

Since the disguise makes him appear bald, he takes on the moniker of Aqri’ūn (Spanish: "Calvo"; English: "Baldhead"), and finds work in the sultan's palace as the new assistant to the gardener, tilling the ground, pulling herbs and watering the seeds. He also takes breaks to bathe in a spring and removes the stomach cap. One day, the local sultan's youngest daughter sees Aqri’ūn without the cap and notices his silken hair. She becomes infatuated with the newcomer and keeps sending him through a maidservant some bread and chicken. Aqri’ūn thanks the princess and sees her at her window.

One day, the howler or town crier announces the sultan is summoning all eligible youths of the city to pass by under the sultan's palace, so the princesses can choose their husbands by throwing a handkerchief at their suitors of choice. The youths do so and the elder two princesses choose their bridegrooms from the crowd, save for the youngest. The youngest princess explains not everyone is there at the assemblage, and the soldiers bring the gardener and his Baldhead assistant, to whom she throws her handkerchief. The soldiers mock the choice, and the sultan marries his elder two to their rich suitors, giving palaces for them and moving out his cadette to a house outside the city with the Aqri’ūn. Aqri’ūn places a sword between himself and the princess so as to not consummate their marriage, since the sultan does not approve their union.

One day, the monarch falls ill and the doctors prescribe gazelle milk, delivered within a gazelle hide. The sons-in-law depart to the wilderness on their pureblood horses, while Aqri’ūn is given a lame mount. Out of sight, he rubs the hairs from his horse friend to summon it, and the animal appears to him. The colt tells him to close his eyes, then takes him to a large palace furnished with gazelles, soldiers and servants. The prince spends the night there and welcomes his brothers-in-law the following morning, who approach the palace. They see the prince, whom they do not recognize as the lowly gardener's assistant, and ask for some gazelle milk. Aqri’ūn, in the prince identity, says they can buy the gazelle milk for gold, pearls, and diamonds. The brothers-in-law have nothing to pay for, but the prince agrees to let them have the milk in exchange for marking the men as his slaves between their shoulders. A deal is made and the men suffer the branding, gaining the gazelle milk in return and bring the milk to the palace, but it spoils after some days. Aqri’ūn rides on his loyal horse to the palace, mounts the lame mule and brings the milk to his father-in-law, to the latter's surprise.

Some time later, war breaks out, and the enemy army is marching to attack the town. Aqri’ūn summons his horse and explains the city is under attack, so the horse bids him take up a sword, for the horse will take him to the battlefield to fight their enemies. The prince defeats the enemies and achieves victories for the kingdom, but is hurt in his hand. He goes to meet his father-in-law on the battlefield and asks for his kerchief to dress his wound, then departs. People start to ask for the identity of the mysterious knight. The princesses gather at their mother's home to talk about the knight, and the cadette princess says she know his identity, then brings her sisters and parents to her humble hut to show them their saviour: Aqri’ūn himself, asleep on the bed with a bandage on his hand. The sultan doubts that his poor son-in-law is their knightly saviour, but Aqri’ūn wakes up and puts on the stomach cap on his head to prove his double role. The youth then tells the sultan the princess is untouched and they will not marry until he approves.

The sultan agrees to marry Aqri’ūn and his youngest daughter, gives them rich gifts and a grand wedding. Later, Aqri’ūn says his people needs him, rubs the hairs of the horse, which appears and takes his rider and the princess to Aqri’ūn's kingdom. However, the prince learns his father has recently died and the realm is being torn apart by a civil war between rival factions of generals who both wish and refuse to enthrone the queen's friend. Aqri’ūn puts an end to the conflict, unites the generals and becomes king after his father, then punishes his wicked stepmother and the royal cook by burning.

== Analysis ==
=== Tale type ===
Rabadán classified the tale as type 532, "El caballo servicial" ("The Helpful Horse"). In type AaTh 532: I Don't Know (The Helpful Horse), of the international Aarne-Thompson Index (henceforth, AaTh or AT), the hero is persecuted by his stepmother, who also sets her sights on the hero's helpful horse, but they escape from home and go to another kingdom, where the hero is instructed to always utter "I don't know"; the hero, under a new identity, performs heroic deeds. However, folklorist Stith Thompson, in his work The Folktale, doubted the existence of the story as an independent tale type, since, barring a different introduction, its main narrative becomes "the same as in the Goldener tale [tale type 314]". This prompted him to suppose the tale type was a "variety" of "Goldener".

A similar notion is shared by Greek folklorists Anna Angelopoulou, Marianthi Kapanoglou and Emmanuela Katrinaki, editors of the Greek Folktale Catalogue: although they classified the Greek variants under type 532 (Greek: Ο Μπιλμέμ), they still recognized that they should be indexed as type 314 (Greek: Ο Κασίδης), since their only difference seems to lie in the introductory episodes. The Hungarian Folktale Catalogue (MNK) also took notice of the great similarity between types 532 and 314, which difficulted a specific classification into one or the other.

Furthermore, German folklorist Hans-Jörg Uther, in his 2004 revision of the international tale type index (henceforth, ATU), subsumed type AaTh 532 under a new tale type, ATU 314, "Goldener", due to "its similar structure and content".

==== Introductory episodes ====
Scholarship notes three different opening episodes to the tale type: (1) the hero becomes a magician's servant and is forbidden to open a certain door, but he does and dips his hair in a pool of gold; (2) the hero is persecuted by his stepmother, but his loyal horse warns him and later they both flee; (3) the hero is given to the magician as payment for the magician's help with his parents' infertility problem. Folklorist Christine Goldberg, in Enzyklopädie des Märchens, related the second opening to former tale type AaTh 532, "The Helpful Horse (I Don't Know)", wherein the hero is persecuted by his stepmother and flees from home with his horse. (Note: According to Stith Thompson's 1961 revision of the index, in type 532 the hero's helpful horse advises him to answer every question with the sentence "I don't know".)

American folklorist Barre Toelken recognized the spread of the tale type across Northern, Eastern and Southern Europe, but identified three subtypes: one that appears in Europe (Subtype 1), wherein the protagonist becomes the servant to a magical person, finds the talking horse and discovers his benefactor's true evil nature, and acquires a golden colour on some part of his body; a second narrative (Subtype 3), found in Greece, Turkey, Caucasus, Uzbekistan and Northern India, where the protagonist is born through the use of a magical fruit; and a third one (Subtype 2). According to Toelken, this Subtype 2 is "the oldest", being found "in Southern Siberia, Iran, the Arabian countries, Mediterranean, Hungary and Poland". In this subtype, the hero (who may be a prince) and the foal are born at the same time and become friends, but their lives are at stake when the hero's mother asks for the horse's vital organ (or tries to kill the boy to hide her affair), which motivates their flight from their homeland to another kingdom.

=== Motifs ===
Professor Anna Birgitta Rooth stated that the motif of the stepmother's persecution of the hero appears in tale type 314 in variants from Slavonic, Eastern European and Near Eastern regions. She also connected this motif to part of the Cinderella cycle, in a variation involving a male hero and his cow.

==== Quest for the remedy ====
A motif that appears in tale type 314 is the hero having to find a cure for the ailing king, often the milk of a certain animal (e.g., a lioness). According to scholar Erika Taube, this motif occurs in tales from North Africa to East Asia, even among Persian- and Arabic-speaking peoples. Similarly, Hasan M. El-Shamy noted that the quest for the king's remedy appears as a subsidiary event "in the Arab-Berber culture area". In addition, Germanist Gunter Dammann, in Enzyklopädie des Märchens, noted that the motif of the quest for the remedy appeared "with relative frequency" in over half of the variants that start with the Subtype 2 opening (stepmother's persecution of hero and horse).

==== Branding the brothers-in-law ====
According to German scholars Günther Damman and Kurt Ranke, another motif that appears in tale type ATU 314 is the hero branding his brothers-in-law during their hunt. Likewise, Ranke stated that the hero's branding represented a mark of his ownership over his brothers-in-law.

Ranke located the motif in the Orient and in the Mediterranean. In the same vein, Hungarian professor Ákos Dömötör, in the notes to tale type ATU 314 in the Hungarian National Catalogue of Folktales (MNK), remarked that the motif was a "reflection of the Eastern legal custom", which also appears in the Turkic epic Alpamysh.

== Variants ==
According to Germanist Günter Dammann, tale type 314 with the opening of hero and horse fleeing home extends from Western Himalaya and South Siberia, to Iran and the Arab-speaking countries in the Eastern Mediterranean. In addition, scholar Hasan El-Shamy stated that type 314 is "widely spread throughout north Africa", among Arabs and Berbers; in Sub-saharan Africa, as well as in Arabia and South Arabia.

=== Seven Magic Hairs ===
In a Palestinian tale from Birzeit, collected by orientalist Paul E. Kahle with the title Kahlköpfchen und das Wunderpferd ("Little Baldhead and the Magic Horse"), a sultan has two wives, a son by the first and two by the second. The first wife's son likes horses, and grooms a foal from the djinni. The magic horse warns the boy about any attempts against his life from his stepmother. One day, the stepmother feigns being ill and her doctor prescribes that the only cure is the flesh of a green horse - exactly the boy's horse's. The boy rides the horse away from his homeland. At a distance, the horse gives the boy seven tufts of its mane, and tells him to burn the hairs should ne nieed his help, and departs. The boy disguises himself with a she-goat's stomach on his head and answers by the name Kahlköpf ("Baldhead"), or, in the original, Qre’un ("Little Baldy"). He works as a menial position for another king. The king's youngest daughter, while taking a bath, sees Baldhead and proclaims she wants him. She joins her sisters in asking their father to set a suitor selection. The first marries the son of a pascha; the second the son of a gouverneur, the third the son of a vizier, and the youngest Baldhead. One day, the king falls ill and the royal doctor says on the flesh of a gazelle may cure him. Baldhead summons the magic horse and asks for a gazelle. Later, war breaks out in the kingdom, and Baldhead rides after his brothers-in-law with a lame horse. Before he joins the fight, he summons his horse friend and defeats the enemies, hurting his hand in the process. Author Inea Bushnaq translated the tale and published it as Seven Magic Hairs, wherein the hero is named Qureyoon ("Baldhead"). Orientalist Paul E. Kahle and Hans Schmidt noted that the tale was a variant of the story of Grindkopf or Goldener, and noticed its resemblance to an Arab Egyptian tale collected by Spitta-Bey.

=== The Story of the Horse and of the Son of a King ===
In a Palestinian tale collected by C. G. Campbell with the title The Story of the Horse and of the Son of a King, the wife of a king gives birth to a son, and at the same time a mare foals. Believing it to be a double blessing, the king has the prince and the foal become friends, the young boy even riding the little animal before he can crawl. In time, however, the queen dies when the boy is ten years old, and the king remarries. The second queen gives birth to her own son, and, four years later, conspires with a witch ways to kill the elder prince and make her son the only heir: first, the witch advises her to fill a pit with swords and cover it with a carpet. The prince, named Hamed, is dared to jump over the hurdle, but is dissuaded by his horse, Nejm, for it is a trap. The horse uses its hind feet to uncover the pit to reveal the trap, and the queen feigns surprise, promising to bake her stepson a cake. The cake is decorated with depictions of the land and the sea, which the queen insists her stepson eats from. Hamed brings a piece to Nejm, but it refuses, advising Hamed to partake of the land portion of the cake. The prince does, while his younger half-brother eats the sea portion and dies. Hamed complains to his father, the king, about some poison in the cake, but the monarch dismisses it as fatality. Back to the queen, enraged at the loss of her own child, she is advised to kill Nejm, the stallion: she feigns illness and says her only cure is the flesh of a fourteen-year-old stallion. The king tells Hamed they will kill the horse, and the youth, in tears, takes his friend to a stream to bathe it. Nejm is also weeping for them, but it has a plan: plant a bloodied knife and leave a saddle and the prince's clothes near the stream, so people will think they killed themselves, and the horse will take Hamed to his destined bride in another kingdom. It happens thus, and both ride away from the kingdom. They reach a beautiful ivory palace that Nejm says is under the power of a menacing Afrit he cannot hope to defeat, and a princess is captive inside. Despite the horse's warnings, Hamed enters the palace and meets a skeleton which says it can help Hamed if the prince promises to give him a proper burial. Hamed agrees to the skeleton's terms, and both enter the princess's room. After some introductions, the trio formulate a plan to destroy the Afrit: by finding a locket that holds its life. Hamed ventures in the mountains with the skeleton and brings the locket with him, as the Afrit returns home and the princess convinces the creature to rest his sword as he sleeps. While the monster is asleep, the three draw out his sword and destroy the locket, killing the Afrit. With the same sword, the skeleton exorcizes the last remains of the Afrit from the princess's mouth. Hamed and the princess bury the skeleton, and ride Nejm to Hamed's homeland. After Hamed returns, his father tells him he discovered his wife's ruse and killed her, and Hamed is crowned prince after him.

== See also ==
- The Black Colt
- The Story of the Prince and His Horse
- The Tale of Clever Hasan and the Talking Horse
