= The Black Colt =

Iranian folk tale about a prince and his magic horse

Folk tale
- Name: The Black Colt
- Also known as: Korre-ye-Siyah
- Aarne–Thompson grouping: ATU 314 (Goldener)
- Region: Iran
- Published in: Folk Tales of Ancient Persia by Forough Hekmat (1974)
- Related: The Wonderful Sea-Horse; The Horse of the Cloud and the Wind; The Magician's Horse; Little Johnny Sheep-Dung; The Gifts of the Magician; Făt-Frumos with the Golden Hair; Donotknow; The Story of the Prince and His Horse; The Tale of Clever Hasan and the Talking Horse; Adventures of a Boy

Black Colt (Persian: کره سیاه, romanized: Korre-ye Siyah) is an Iranian folktale published by author Forough Hekmat in 1974. It is classified in the international Aarne-Thompson-Uther Index as ATU 314, "Goldener". It deals with a friendship between a king's son and a magic horse that are forced to flee for their lives due to the boy's stepmother, and reach another kingdom, where the boy adopts another identity.

Although it differs from variants wherein a hero acquires golden hair, its starting sequence (persecution by the hero's stepmother) is considered by scholarship as an alternate opening to the same tale type.

== Summary ==
In a land to the east of Persia, a king rules with his beautiful wife. She bears him a son they name Malik Khorsheed ("The Sun Prince"). His destiny is foretold to be an unhappy one. He grows up to be a fine horseman and great archer.

One day, his mother dies, and the boy falls into a deep sadness. To appease the boy's grief, the king's viziers tell the king a dervish has come to the palace to bring a gift to the prince: a black colt with a star on its head. The prince takes the horse - which he named Korreh-ę-Siyah ("Black Colt") - as his friend and companion, and spends the days riding the horse after his studies.

Years pass, and the king marries again. The new queen begins to despise her stepson, because her husband spends most of his time with the boy, and begins to plot against him. Black Colt senses that the new queen is secretly harbouring ill-will towards the boy, and warns him to be on his guard for any attempt on his life. Malik Khorsheed dismisses the colt's warnings, but heeds the words.

And so the queen begins her plans: she orders some servants to dig up a hole on the way to the stables and fill it with branches. Malik Khorsheed escapes the first attempt by taking another path to the stables, and because the colt warned him. The next time, the queen brings some poisoned food to his room, but the colt warned him not to eat any food she gives him.

The queen, then, plots to destroy the only thing the boy loves more than his father, the horse. With the help from her Qamar Vizir, she feigns illness and her personal doctor advises a three-day diet of the meat of a black horse. After hearing this, the shah is in a dilemma: to save his queen, whose life is more valuable than an animal, he must kill the horse and deeply hurt his own son. He decides on killing the colt, and finding another horse for his son.

Malik Khorsheed goes to the stables and talks to his Black Colt, which talks to him about the grim fate that awaits it, on the very orders of his father, the shah. Black Colt reveals the new queen's deception, and laments that the boy could not convince his father to the contrary. The horse, however, concocts a plan: the next day, when the clock strikes ten, the horse will neigh to draw his attention, and Malik Khorsheed must leave school, and ask his father for one last ride on the horse.

The next day, the colt is guided to the sacrifice, to the queen's delight. Meanwhile, Malik Khorsheed escapes from his mentor's classes by throwing a handful of ashes on his mouth to stop him, and runs to the palace's gardens, but reaches the wrong side. He jumps over a low wall and runs to his horse. He stops the execution in the nick of time and demands an explanation from the servants. The servants explain that the shah, his father, ordered the horse's execution for the sake of the queen's health. Saddened, the prince asks them to allow him a last ride on the horse.

The guards and servants give him a bridle and a saddle. Malik Khorsheed mounts the horse and they escape from the palace by jumping aloft, high in the air. The shah and the queen watch the whole scene as rider and mount disappear into the air, far away from the kingdom.

Malik Khorsheed and the Black Colt watch the whole world in their aerial flight, passing through mountains and valleys, even the peaks of "purple Elburz Mountains". They finally land in the lands of the Shah of Western Persia, and the Black Colt tells him that they must depart for a while, but the animal will help him: it lets the prince take some hairs from its tail, which he can use to summon him by burning them. Black Colt also advises the prince to hide his royal clothes and to find a new identity in this new land, then departs.

Malik Khorsheed follows the horse's instructions and hides the royal garments in a saddlebag, then asks a goatherd on the road for a goat's stomach to wear as a cap, so that he appears to be bald. He reaches the city of the Shah of Western Persia and finds work as the apprentice of the shah's gardener, tending to the flowers of the royal gardens.

At certain times, the weather is so hot that people take a nap in the afternoon, and Malik Khorsheed takes the opportunity to ride the Black Colt while no one is paying attention. So he burns the horse's hairs to summon it, rides it for a while, then returns to his daily duties.

One day, he gives a suggestion to the gardener if he can redesign the garden's flower-beds. He does and so impressive they look that they become the people's talk. Another task the boy does is to bring bouquets for the three princesses along with a written poem for each of them. The youngest princess, beautiful Peri-zaad ("Fairy-born"), decides to look into the recent changes in her father's garden, and goes down to the garden to inquire the gardener. The old gardener replies to the princess that his new apprentice is responsible for the changes. The princess amazes at the boy's sensibility, despite his strange and ugly looks.

She then talks to the gardener's apprentice, the baldheaded boy, who is tending some flowers in the garden. As the princess talks to him, he notices her great beauty, but regains his composure and tells her he is a friendless youth who wandered into her father's city. Intrigued by the gardener's manners, the princess returns to talk to him, and she begins to pine for the lowly boy.

Some time later, the princesses' marriageability is assessed by analysing the ripeness of three melons. The king then summons all noble-born youths to his palace for his three daughters to choose their husbands by throwing a red apple to their suitor of choice. Peri-zaad looks to the crowd of assembled noblemen in hopes of seeing the gardener, but he is not there. Her elders sisters choose the sons of the Vizier of the Right Hand and the Vizier of the Left Hand for their husband, while Peri-zaad tries to hold on to hers for a bit longer.

The shah grows impatient with his daughter's indecision, and secretly orders the guards to bring every youth in the city. The guards first stop by the garden to bring the gardener's apprentice to the palace. As soon as the boy appears the royal chambers, the princess is delighted at his arrival, and tosses her red apple to him, much to her father's horror at her choosing a lowly man as her husband.

The shah congratulates his two elder daughters and banishes Peri-zaad from the palace for this affront, as well as strips her of her royal rank and privileges. Peri-zaad seems happy with her choice, even if Malik notices that she sacrificed her royal status for him. Malik questions her decision, but the princess answers he was her choice, and goes to live with him in his shabby cottage.

Some time into their marriage life, Malik rides Black Colt away from the cottage, but Peri-zaad sees her husband in the distance as if he is a completely different man. When he returns from his secret ride, the princess inquires him about his origins, and he tells her everything: the horse's help, his step-mother's plans, and his flight to her father's kingdom. They agree to keep it his true identity a secret for now before it arises any suspicions.

Some time later, the princess's nurse goes to Malik's cottage to tell her about her father's illness, and how his two sons-in-law are hunting for venison to use in a healing broth. Peri-zaad then asks her husband to ride Black Colt and find deer for her father. Meanwhile, the two other sons-in-law ride as far away to Eastern Persia and find a herd of deer. They see that the deer are grazing near a splendid tent, which they learn belongs to Shah-zadeh Malik Khorsheed.

The two princes are brought to Malik's presence and they do not recognize him as the gardener's apprentice. The duo tell him they are looking for a cure for their king. Malik agrees to let them take some venison from his herds, but in exchange they will allow him to brand them as his slaves. Both men are perplexed at first, but, thinking no one will ever know beyond the three of them, they consent to be branded and take the venison back to Western Persia.

Malik thanks his loyal horse, Black Colt, for the idea, and rides it back to his wife before the other. He arrives at his cottage and gives her the venison to prepare a broth for her father. Moments later, the two other princes arrive with the deer meat and prepare them. Three bowls with broth are brought before the king: the first one tasteless, the second one heavily seasoned, but the third, by Peri-zaad and Malik, on point. He eats the broth with meat her daughter brought and asks his guards to bring her to him.

The guards go to the gardener's cottage, but do not find neither the princess nor her husband. They decide to leave the palace to begin a search for them all around the country, but as soon as they leave the palace gates, they see a magnificent palace just two miles from the shah's own: Qasr-e-zar-negaar ("The Gold-Pictured Palace"). Certainly - they think - a fairy prince has come to visit them.

The shah is alerted of this and receives their guest with the appropriate pomp. Their guest, Shah-zadeh Malik Khorsheed, enters his father-in-law's palace in regal garments and riding on Black Colt. In the royal chambers, he explains he has come to get his two slaves, the shah's two sons-in-law. The shah does not understand the motive of the prince's visit, until he summons his sons-in-law and they disrobe to show the slave brands.

Malik Khorsheed then invites the shah to his palace, Qasr-e-zar-negaar, for a banquet, where they are to discuss the delivery of the two slaves to him. The shah agrees and the next day he goes with a retinue of courtiers to Qasr-e-zar-negaar. Every room they enter, they admire the exquisite architecture and craftmanship, until they reach the throne room. Malik Khorsheed arrives with a veiled Peri-zaad at his side. The princess makes a bow before her father and lifts her veil to show her face to him.

The shah rejoices at seeing his daughter again, and learns of Malik Khorsheed's whole story. The shah begs for their forgiveness, and embraces Malik as his son-in-law. However, Malik tells him he still misses his homeland, in Eastern Persia, and wishes to bring his wife, Peri-zaad, with him. The shah is sad to part with his daughter, by gives the couple his blessing and they depart the next morning on Black Colt, flying all the way from Western Persia to Eastern Persia.

Back in Eastern Persia, Malik's father has been mourning his son after his departure, and banished his wicked new wife on a horse. A servant comes to him with the strangest news: a flying horse is coming to their kingdom! Hearing this, the king hopes - and prays - it is Black Colt, bringing home his son. The horse lands in the palace's gardens with Malik and the princess. The king is exultant to get his son back, and orders a 40-day feast to be held.

On the last night of festivities, a servant comes to tell Malik that his steed, Black Colt, has disappeared from the stables. Hurt by the news of his friend's departure, he goes to the stables and finds no trace of the horse, save for a mat with some of its black hairs on it. Malik squats down to pick them up and hears the steed's voice, as if in a dream, telling him they must separate, but, should the prince need his steed, he just has to burn the hairs, and Black Colt will come at once. Malik is grateful for this one last gift.

== Analysis ==
=== Tale type ===
The tale is classified in the Aarne-Thompson-Uther Index as type ATU 314, "The Goldener": a youth with golden hair works as the king's gardener. The type may also open with the prince for some reason being the servant of an evil being, where he gains the same gifts, and the tale proceeds as in this variant. In this case, it is an "independent Near Eastern subtype of AT 314".

Professor Ulrich Marzolph, in his catalogue of Persian folktales, named type 314 in Iranian sources as Das Zauberfohlen ("The Magic Horse"): the horse saves the protagonist from jealous relatives and takes him to another kingdom; in this kingdom, the protagonist is advised by the horse to dress in shabby garments (as a "Kačal") and work as the king's gardener; a princess falls in love with him. Marzolph listed 17 variants of this type across Persian sources. In addition, according to Marzolph, the tale type, also known as Korre-ye daryā'i (German: Das Meeresfohlen; English: "The Sea Foal"), is one of the most collected types in the archives of Markaz-e farhang-e mardom (Centre of Popular Culture), and a well-known Iranian folktale.

==== Introductory episodes ====
Scholarship notes three different opening episodes to the tale type: (1) the hero becomes a magician's servant and is forbidden to open a certain door, but he does and dips his hair in a pool of gold; (2) the hero is persecuted by his stepmother, but his loyal horse warns him and later they both flee; (3) the hero is given to the magician as payment for the magician's help with his parents' infertility problem. Folklorist Christine Goldberg, in Enzyklopädie des Märchens, related the second opening to former tale type AaTh 532, "The Helpful Horse (I Don't Know)", wherein the hero is persecuted by his stepmother and flees from home with his horse. (Note: According to Stith Thompson's 1961 revision of the index, in type 532 the hero's helpful horse advises him to answer every question with the sentence "I don't know".)

American folklorist Barre Toelken recognized the spread of the tale type across Northern, Eastern and Southern Europe, but identified three subtypes: one that appears in Europe (Subtype 1), wherein the protagonist becomes the servant to a magical person, finds the talking horse and discovers his benefactor's true evil nature, and acquires a golden colour on some part of his body; a second narrative (Subtype 3), found in Greece, Turkey, Caucasus, Uzbekistan and Northern India, where the protagonist is born through the use of a magical fruit; and a third one (Subtype 2). According to Toelken, this Subtype 2 is "the oldest", being found "in Southern Siberia, Iran, the Arabian countries, Mediterranean, Hungary and Poland". In this subtype, the hero (who may be a prince) and the foal are born at the same time and become friends, but their lives are at stake when the hero's mother asks for the horse's vital organ (or tries to kill the boy to hide her affair), which motivates their flight from their homeland to another kingdom.

=== Motifs ===
Professor Anna Birgitta Rooth stated that the motif of the stepmother's persecution of the hero appears in tale type 314 in variants from Slavonic, Eastern European and Near Eastern regions. She also connected this motif to part of the Cinderella cycle, in a variation involving a male hero and his cow.

==== The suitor selection test ====
The motif of the princess throwing an apple to her suitor is indexed as motif H316, "Suitor test: apple thrown indicates princess' choice (often golden apple)". According to mythologist Yuri Berezkin and other Russian researchers, the motif is "popular" in Iran, and is also attested "in Central Europe, the Balkans, the Caucasus, the Near East, and Central Asia". In the same vein, professor Mahomed-Nuri Osmanovich Osmanov noted that the motif of the princess throwing an item to choose her husband is "widespread" ("распространение", in the original) in tales from the Iranian peoples.

According to Turkologist Karl Reichl, types ATU 314 and ATU 502 contain this motif: the princess chooses her own husband (of lowly appearance) in a gathering of potential suitors, by giving him an object (e.g., an apple). However, he also remarks that the motif is "spread in folk literature" and may appear in other tale types.

Germanist Günter Dammann, in Enzyklopädie des Märchens, argued that Subtype 2 (see above) represented the oldest form of the Goldener narrative, since the golden apple motif in the suitor selection roughly appears in the geographic distribution of the same subtype.

===== Literary parallels =====
Some scholars have compared the motif to marriage rites and customs attested in ancient literature. For example, Günter Dammann, in Enzyklopädie des Märchens, compared the motif to the Indian ritual of svayamvara, and reported evidence of a similar practice in Ancient Iran.

French folklorist Emmanuel Cosquin noted that the suitor selection test was component of a larger narrative: the princess or bride-to-be chooses the hero, in lowly disguise, by throwing him an apple. According to him, this motif would be comparable to the ancient Indian ritual of svayamvara, wherein the bride, in a public gathering, would choose a husband by giving him a garland of flowers. In addition, Swedish scholar Waldemar Liungman (1948), who argued for its remote antiquity, saw in the golden apple motif a mark of the princess's self-choice of husband, and traced a parallel between it and a narrative cited by Aristotle regarding the founding of Massalia (modern day Marseille).

Similarly, in an ancient treatise written by historian Mirkhond, translated by linguist David Shea, it is reported that prince Gushtasp went to the land of "Room" during a suitor selection test held by princess Kitabun: as it was custom, a maiden of marriageable age was to walk through an assemblage of noble men with an orange and throw it to her husband-to-be. Gushtasp attends the event and the princess throws her orange to him, indicating her choice.

In regards to a similar tale from the Dungan people, according to Sinologist Boris L. Riftin, the motif of a princess (or woman of high social standing) throwing a silken ball atop a high tower to choose her husband is reported in the ancient Chinese story of "Lu Meng-Zheng": the princess throws a silken ball to a passing youth named Meng-Zheng (a poor student), and the king expels his daughter to live with her husband in a cave. In addition, some scholars (e.g., Ting Nai-tung, Wolfram Eberhard, Phra Indra Montri (Francis Giles)) remarked that a similar wedding folk custom (a maiden throwing a ball from a balcony to her husband of choice) was practiced among some Chinese minorities and in South China. The motif is also reported in ancient Chinese literature.

==== The gardener hero ====
Swedish scholar Waldemar Liungman drew attention to a possible ancient parallel to the gardener hero of the tale type: in an account of the story of king Sargon of Akkad, he, in his youth, works as a gardener in a palace and attracts the attention of goddess Ishtar. According to scholars Wolfram Eberhard and Pertev Naili Boratav, this would mean that the motif is "very old" ("sehr alt") in the Near East.

According to Richard MacGillivray Dawkins, in the tale type, the hero as gardener destroys and restores the garden after he finds work, and, later, fights in the war. During the battle, he is injured, and the king dresses his wound with a kerchief, which will serve as token of recognition.

==== The helpful horse ====
According to scholars James R. Russell and Wheeler Thackston, the bahri, merhorse or sea-stallion appears in the folklore of Iranian peoples. (Note: However, the sea-born horse also appears in the folklore of Turkic peoples, either itself coming from a water body or being the result of a mating between a sea-stallion and a terrestrial mare.) On its own, the merhorse is a fantastical equine imbued with human speech, the ability to fly and other magical powers, and acts as the hero's helper.

In addition, according to Gudrun Schubert and Renate Würsch, the horse may be known as Asp-i-baḥrī ('Meerpferd'), that is, an equine that lives in the sea or other water bodies. The merhorse or its foal also appear in epic tradition as the hero's mount. (Note: Although, according to researcher Elizabeth Lambourn and Indologist Wendy Doniger, the word bahri, 'from or of the sea' (in Lambourn) or 'seaborne' (in Doniger), refers to the importation of Arabian and Persian horses via maritime trade to South Asia, during the Sultanate period.) Also, according to professor Erika Friedl, the merhorse may be identified as a black foal (korreh siāh), with a name like Siāhqeitun ('Black Led-horse') or Qeitās (derived from Arabic language bahri qutās) - a character that also appears as hero Siavosh's mount, Shabrang.

==== Quest for the remedy ====
A motif that appears in tale type 314 is the hero having to find a cure for the ailing king, often the milk of a certain animal (e.g., a lioness). According to scholar Erika Taube, this motif occurs in tales from North Africa to East Asia, even among Persian- and Arabic-speaking peoples. Similarly, Hasan M. El-Shamy noted that the quest for the king's remedy appears as a subsidiary event "in the Arab-Berber culture area".

In addition, Germanist Gunter Dammann, in Enzyklopädie des Märchens, noted that the motif of the quest for the remedy appeared "with relative frequency" in over half of the variants that start with the Subtype 2 opening (stepmother's persecution of hero and horse).

==== Branding the brothers-in-law ====
According to German scholars Günther Damman and Kurt Ranke, another motif that appears in tale type ATU 314 is the hero branding his brothers-in-law during their hunt. Likewise, Ranke stated that the hero's branding represented a mark of his ownership over his brothers-in-law.

Ranke located the motif in the Orient and in the Mediterranean. Similarly, according to Arthur Christensen, marking the brothers-in-law is "common" in the Oriental versions. In the same vein, Hungarian professor Ákos Dömötör, in the notes to tale type ATU 314 in the Hungarian National Catalogue of Folktales (MNK), remarked that the motif was a "reflection of the Eastern legal custom", which also appears in the Turkic epic Alpamysh.

== Variants ==
According to Germanist Gunter Dammann, tale type 314 with the opening of hero and horse fleeing home extends from Western Himalaya and South Siberia, to Iran and the Arab-speaking countries in the Eastern Mediterranean. In addition, scholar Hasan El-Shamy stated that type 314 is "widely spread throughout north Africa", among Arabs and Berbers; in sub-Saharan Africa, as well as in Arabia and South Arabia.

=== Iran ===
==== The Colt Qéytās ====
In a Persian tale collected by Emily Lorimer and David Lockhart Robertson Lorimer from Kermānī with the title The Story of the Colt Qéytās or Qéytās the Colt, a king's son is friends with a colt named Qéytās. His father remarries. One day, the colt cries to the boy and confesses that his stepmother plans to kill him: on her first attempts, she tries to poison the boy's food (first, the āsh; then the pulau); on the second, she digs a well and places blades inside. After her attempts are thwarted, the stepmother feigns illness with a doctor's help and convinces her husband to kill the horse and use its fat as cure for her. Qéytās warns the prince they plan to kill it, and conspires with the boy a way to save them both: the next day, the prince is to ask his father to put his royal robes and crowns on him, bedeck the horse with jewels and allow him to ride a last time on it, by circling the house three times.

The horse's plan works and they escape to another kingdom. Now at a safe distance, Qéytās advises the boy to wear a sheepskin on his head and to seek employment with the king's gardener, and gives him one hair of its mane. The boy is hired as the king's gardener. One day, feeling lonely, he summons the horse to ride around the garden. The king's youngest daughter, a princess, from her window, sees the boy and falls in love with him. The princess goes to the gardens to question his identity, and the boy answers her that he is a "scald-headed". Some time later, the king's three daughters reach marriageable age (by comparing the ripeness of three melons) and take part in a husband selection contest by throwing oranges to their suitors. The elder princesses throw theirs to the Wizir's two sons, while the third princess throws hers to the gardener. Some time later, the king becomes ill and only the bird found in a distant desert can cure him. The boy, riding on Qéytās, gets the bird. Before he returns to the kingdom, he meets his brothers-in-law, who do not recognize him. He agrees to give hem the bird in exchange for them signing a pact to be the stranger's slaves, also suffer being branded on their backs. Marzolph classified this tale as his type 314. The story was rewritten as The Magic Pony by author Kathleen Arnott in her book Animal folk tales around the world and as The Black Colt by author Margaret Mayo in the work Book of Magical Horses.

==== The Black Foal (Christensen) ====
In an Iranian tale published by orientalist Arthur Christensen with the title Das schwarze Füllen and translated as The Black Foal, a king has a 14-year-old son and remarries, but his new wife hates her step-son. The boy has a pet black foal, which the stepmother also detests, and plans to kill it to hurt the boy: she bribes the slave girls of the king's harem to say the queen needs the meat of the black foal to be cured. The royal physicians concur with the slave girls and prescribe the meat of the foal. The king laments that he has to sacrifice the prince's pet horse, but wants to heal his wife, and decides his son is to be held at school for the entire day as to not see his pet's execution. Meanwhile, the foal cries to its owner and tells of his stepmother's plot to kill it, but plans with the prince to neigh three times to alert him.

The next day, the prince is being held in school, when he hears the horse's neighing, and rushes back to the foal to save it. With tears, the prince pleads to his father and the boy is to ask his father for one last ride on the horse. The king agrees to indulge his son, and, per his request, prepares a fine saddle filled with gems and money. The prince climbs onto the horse, circles the courtyard two times and on the third time flies away on the horse to another kingdom. When they land, the foal gives some of its coat ("Körper", in Christensen's text) hairs to the prince which can be used to summon it, since, as the horse explains, the equine belongs to the family of the Peris, and departs. The prince enters the hut of a Kallepazi, buys a sheep's bladder to wear as a cap on his head, and finds work as apprentice to the sultan's gardener. One day, the prince fashions seven beautiful bouquets (or bunches) for the sultan's seven daughters, who notice the exquisite craftsmanship. Later, on one hot day, believing that no one is watching him, the prince goes to bathe in a rivulet behind the palace, leaves the water and summons his foal for a ride - an event witnessed by the youngest princess. Some time later, the princesses bring melons to their father as analogy for their marriageability, and the sultan prepares a suitor selection test: every man is to gather at a certain place, and the princesses are to throw an orange to their husbands of choice. The elder six princesses choose the vizier's son, an emir's son and sons of princes, while the youngest chooses the baldheaded gardener.

Offended at her choice, the kings considers her dead to him, but the princess cannot be happier with her husband, and they move out to a small house on the outskirts of the town. Some time later, the king falls ill, and only broth made with gazelle meat can cure him. The prince summons his black foal to hunt some gazelles, and reaches the forest before his brothers-in-law. He asks the foal to command the Peris to make preparations for a royal hunt and to draw the animals to him, and so it happens. The brothers-in-law ride into the forest, and find the prince in royal garbs, unaware he is the lowly gardener. Seeing that the man has the gazelles all around him, they ask him to share some. The prince agrees to a deal: the meat in exchange for branding a slave mark on their backs. The prince gives them the carcasses and keeps the heads for himself. He returns home and gives the gazelle heads for his wife to prepare a broth for the sultan. He health improves after he eats the youngest's dish. At the end of the tale, the prince doff the lowly gardener disguise and sets up his tents outside the sultan's kingdom. The sultan's scouts report that the prince is looking for his six slaves. The prince is welcomed by the sultan with a grand reception, and points to the sultan's sons-in-law as his slaves. Then, the seventh princess comes out of a curtain and reveals the prince is her husband, the gardener. The sultan, at last, recognizes the prince as his successor and crowns him.

==== Foal (Osmanov) ====
Professor Mahomed-Nuri Osmanovich Osmanov published an Iranian tale titled "Жеребенок" ("Foal"). In this tale, a man and a wife have a son. When he is 8 or 9 years old, the father sends him to school. Around the same time, his wife dies and he marries another woman. The new step-mother dislikes her step-son, and conspires with a witch ways to kill him. Her first attempt is to poison a bowl of food and serve him. The boy's pet horse warns him of the threat and he avoids eating the food. She repeats the poison plot with a cake, which he also avoids. The next attempt is for her to dig up a hole and cover it with a carpet, so that he falls in it. This plan is also foiled. Tired of her defeats, she consults with the witch again and she suggests someone in the house has been protecting the boy. The step-mother deduces it is the horse, and concocts a plan to get rid of him: she conspires with a doctor to feign illness and to ask for horse meat as the only cure for her. Her husband agrees to sacrifice his son's horse to get its meat for her, but the horse and the boy also have a plan of their own.

As the horse is taken to the garden to be put down, it whinnies three times to draw the boy's attention to go out of school. The boy hears the whinny, tosses some dust on the mullah's face to distract him, and hurries back home to save his horse. He rides the animal and leaps over the assembled crowd and rushes far away from home. He meets a humble shepherd and buys from him a goat's stomach to place it in his head. He finds work as the king's gardener. Some time into his job, he summons his horse to ride alone in the garden. The princess sees him from her window and falls in love with the mysterious rider. She deduces the rider is the gardener. In the suitor selection ceremony, the princess and her elder sisters choose their respective husbands by throwing oranges to the noblemen. The youngest princess, however, tosses hers to the gardener. The king escorts her and his lowly son-in-law to the stables. Later, the king falls ill, and only deer meat can cure him. The gardener departs to get some venison, and finds his brothers-in-law in the same mission. Wearing rich garments, he introduces himself to the princes and offers them the venison, in exchange for branding their backs.

==== The Colt of Clouds and Wind ====
In an Iranian tale collected by author Moniro Ravanipour with the title "کره ابر و باد" (lit. 'korre abr e bâd', 'Colt of Cloud and Wind'), a man has a wife and son. The woman buys a colt for her son and tells him to feed it with sugar and talk to it every night, then passes away. Some time later, the man remarries, and the boy follows his mother's last request to look after the animal. The man's new wife notices the horse colt is not ordinary, but "of the clouds and wind", and also decides to try and feed it, but the animal only interacts with the boy. One day, the man has to go on a business trip, and leaves both the horse and the boy under his wife's care, but she secretly plots to kill both.

First, the woman drops poison in her step-son's meal and sets a table for him. After he returns from school, the boy goes to play with the horse, and the animal warns him not to touch the food, but eat it from another pot. Next, she poisons the pond, then his tea, but with the horse's warning, he avoids the danger: he drinks water from the well and takes some bread, avoiding the tea altogether. Failing all attempts on her step-son, she realizes the horse is helping him, and bribes the doctor and the boy's teacher to hold him at school the next day. She explains she is ill and the doctor prescribed the liver of a horse of clouds and wind as her cure.

After her husband returns, he sees his wife in a sorry state, and is told she went after the horse in the mountains and fell ill. The doctor explains that the liver of a horse of clouds and wind can heal her. The man asks where they can find such an animal, and they point to his son's pet animal. After the boy returns that evening, the horse alerts him it will be killed the next morning, after it neighs three times. The boy then pockets his belongings, and hides some coins and ashes for the school the next day.

The next morning, the boy goes to school and hears the horse's neighing. His teachers ask him to sit down, but he throws some coins to the other students and ashes at the teachers' faces, and rushes home. He stops the horse's execution in the nick of time, and asks to be allowed one last ride on it, since he never took the chance to do it. His father indulges the boy, who mounts on the horse, rides around a few times, then flies away to a distant kingdom. Both land, the horse gives some tufts of its mane to the boy, then departs. The boy then finds a shepherd, buys a sheep and places a rumen on his head to pretend he is bald, then asks the king's gardener for a job. The gardener hires him, letting him sleep in the garden at night while he waters the flowers by day.

One day, he summons the horse by burning its hairs and rides around the garden - an event witnessed by the king's youngest daughter, who falls in love with him. Later, the king summons in the city square an assemblage of eligible suitors for the seven princesses to choose from by throwing an apple. The six elder princesses throw theirs to generals, while the youngest throws her to the baldhead gardener. She is asked to throw her again, and she still chooses the lowly boy. The youngest sister marries the gardener and moves out of the palace.

Some time later, the king falls ill, and the doctors prescribe some deer meet for him. The six sons-in-law ride to hunt, and the gardener summons his loyal horse and asks the animal to set up a tent and gather the preys around. The six sons-in-law cannot find any suitable game, and reach their brother-in-law's tent (who they do not recognize), with several animals around it. They ask for some carcasses, and the boy agrees, uttering that the taste is in the head, branding them on their backs before they leave. The meat from the carcasses cannot cure the king, but a dish made of their heads, prepared by the seventh princess, restores his health.

Later, the princess inquires her husband about his origins, but he deflects the question, saddening her. Worried about his wife, the boy summons the horse again and requests a large palace be erected next to his father-in-law's, and to carry the princess there. The next day, the king goes to summon the people for the morning prayers and marvels at the palace that appeared overnight. He sends an emissary to check on the owner of the large palace, and he returns with a reply: the lord of the palace is looking for his six runaway slaves. The boy, in fine royal garments, enters the king's court and points to his six brothers-in-law as his slaves, who lift their robes to show the brand on their bodies. The boy clarifies the whole situation and sends for his wife, he forgives his brothers-in-law and their wives, and goes to rule after his father-in-law after he dies.

==== The young man disguises himself and gets the princess ====
In a tale from the Vafsi language translated as The young man disguises himself and gets the princess, a man has a son he dotes on. When his wife dies, he remarries, but his new wife has a row with her stepson, who beats her two or three times. In retaliation, the stepmother plans to poison her stepson, but the boy gets word of this and flees home with his magic horse to another kingdom. In this kingdom, he wears a sheep's rumen on his head - so he looks like a bald man -, dresses in shabby clothes and wanders through the city. Meanwhile, the kingdom's three princesses are still unmarried and bring melons to their father as analogy for their marriageability. The king then orders his vizier to summon the people to the square, where his daughters are to release falcons at random, and whomever the birds land on, they shall marry.

The people gather in the square, and the princesses release their falcons: the eldest's lands on the vizier's son, the middle one's on the deputy's son, and the youngest's on the bald man. Some time later, the king goes blind, and sends his three sons-in-law to get him some meat. Two sons-in-law ride in magnificent horses, while the bald man is given a weaker horse. When he is out of sight, the bald man takes off the shabby disguise, burns a hair from his horse and summons him, and both ride to the valley to hunt some deer. A while later, his brothers-in-law come along and, not recognizing him, ask for some of the deer. The youth agrees to give them the carcasses and keep the deer heads, in exchange for them allowing to be branded in their thighs. After they seal the transaction and leave, the youth dismisses his magic horse, puts on the sheep's rumen and shabby clothes to become once again a bald man, and rides back to his poor hut. As for the king, he tastes dishes prepared with the deer meat, but his sight does not improve. The bald man then suggests his wife, the youngest princess, invites her father for deer head soup.

With nothing to lose, the king accepts the invitation and goes to his daughter's poor hut for a meagre dinner, but he eats the soup and his health improves. Now that his opinion of his son-in-law improves, the king suggests the bald man to find a location to build a better house for himself and his wife. After the king goes back to his castle, the bald man, who has a magic ring of Solomon, commands it to provide him with a palace larger than the king's; he then summons his magic horse, which brings him his fine clothes. After the palace is built, the youth sends footmen to invite the king for a feast. The king, his father-in-law, goes to the palace with his vizier and his sons-in-law and dines with the stranger. The stranger, who the king does not recognize as his youngest daughter's husband, tells the guests he is after his two slaves, and indicates his brothers-in-law as such, telling them about their branded thighs.

==== Magic Foal (Romaskevich) ====
Russian Iranist Alexander Romaskevich collected in Shiraz a tale he translated as "Волшебный жеребёнок" ("Magic Foal"), in the Sivandi language. In this tale, a king loses his wife and remarries. The man's son, Махад-Малик-падишах (Mahad-Malik-padishah), goes to a herd of horses and chooses a black foal to bring home. He feeds the little animal with dried fruits and milk, and eventually the foal begins to understand human speech. One day, the king remarries, but his new wife hates the prince, Mahad-Malik-padishah, and plots to kill him: first, she drips poison in a tan bucket filled with water for the prince to drink when he comes back from the mullah; next, the queen poisons his soup; thirdly, she gives him some tea laced with poison.

When the prince comes back from school, his foal friend warns him about each attempt and he avoids all dangers. After failing to poison the prince's food, the queen digs up a hole, fills it with swords and sabres, and places a carpet on it for the prince to fall. Again, the black foal warns the prince. Suspecting something, the queen spies on a conversation between the boy and the foal, and traces a new course of action: she bribes the mullah, the akhund, and the doctor to lie to the king that she is ill and needs the blood of a black foal as remedy. The king comes back and falls for the queen's deception, but has doubts about killing his son's horse, until he is convinced by the bribed scholars and doctor. The next day, the prince goes to meet the horse, which warns him it will be sacrificed that morning, so it will neigh three times to alert him; while he is at the mullah, the prince is to throw some coins to cause a ruckus among the other students, and rush immediately to its help. In school, the prince is held by the akhund, but he throws some coins to his colleagues and rushes back to help his horse, requesting another ride on it. He prepares two quivers with gold, arranges a saddle and mounts on the horse. The foal lifts up and flies away in an aerial journey. When they land, the foal gives the prince some of its hairs, which he should burn in case he needs its help. Mahad-Malik-padishah goes to meet a shepherd and buys from him a sheepskin to place on his head, then goes to a nearby city to find work. He is hired as an assistant to the king's gardener, and arranges floral bouquets for the king's daughters.

Every day, Mahad-Malik-padishah goes to swim in a lake in the garden, which just happens to be located in front of the third princess's sleeping quarters. One day, she spies on him and realizes he must be of royal origin. Her sisters also comment about their lack of husbands, when the vizier comes up with a plan: they are to send a slave to the king with three cucumbers of varying ripeness representing their marriageability. The king receives the strange dish and the vizier explains it to him. Thus, the king orders for everyone to remain in the premises of the city the next day, and gives oranges to the princesses, for them to throw at the chest of their husbands of choice. The eldest throws her to the vizier's son, the middle one to the vakil's son, but the youngest withholds hers. The king orders the soldiers to bring whoever is in the garden, and bring the gardener's assistant to the assemblage. As soon as the princess spots him, she throws her orange at him. The king this she made a mistake, so she repeats the action, and still throws hers to the gardener's assistant. Enraged, the king disowns her and orders her to be moved to the stables with her fiancé, while the elder princesses marry in grand seven-day celebrations.

After the weddings, the king's two sons-in-law decide to go on a hunt. The gardener's assistant also wishes to take part in the hunt, and asks for a lame mount. Mahad-Malik-padishah goes to the wilderness and summons his loyal black horse, whom he asks to whinny and summon every animal next to him, and with a second whinny create a large tent, visible in the distance. The vizier's son and the vakil's son reach the large tent after seven days and meet their brother-in-law, whom they do not recognize, and tell him they have been hunting in the mountains for some game, to no avail. They ask for two carcasses, and Mahad-Malik-padishah agrees, as long as he takes the heads for himself and brands the other men in their thighs. Mahad-Malik-padishah says over the heads for the taste to be retained in these parts, and gives the other two the carcasses. The brothers-in-law return home with their game, while Mahad-Malik-padishah dismisses the black foal and returns to his lowly disguise. The game is prepared in a porridge for the king, but the meat caught by the brothers-in-law is insipid, while the gardener's dish is tasty.

That same night, Mahad-Malik-padishah burns his foal's hairs and summons it again, then requests him to summon an army to surround the king's city. The next day, the muezzin goes to make the morning call for prayer and finds the army all around the city. The king is alerted and takes his court to meet with the army's leader, Mahad-Malik-padishah, whom he does not recognize as the gardener's assistant. Mahad-Malik-padishah introduces himself as a passing traveller, coming from the East to the West in search of his two slaves; if he does not surrender them, he will use the army to destroy the walls around the city. The king issues an order for everyone to remain in the city, until a thorough search produces the slaves. The king's two sons-in-law have hidden themselves in a lavatory. They are found and brought to Mahad-Malik-padishah, who points them as his two slaves, which can be confirmed by the brands on their bodies. Mahad-Malik-padishah then mocks his brothers-in-law, and reveals he was the lowly gardener's assistant. The king places his crown over his head, but Mahad-Malik-padishah declines it. Finally, Mahad-Malik-padishah is given a proper wedding celebration for seven days and seven nights.

==== Black Foal (Kazerun) ====
In an Iranian tale from Kazerun with the title "کرهاسب سیاه" ("The Black Horse Foal"), an orphan prince lives with his father and stepmother, who wants to destroy him. One day, he goes to a lone hunt in the plains and meets a pair of black equines which deliver him their young. The foal can talk and promises loyalty and friendship to the prince. The prince brings it back home and takes care of the animal. The queen discovers the bond between her step-son and the foal and decides to destroy the horse: she feigns illness and asks for the blood of a black foal as cure. The king falls for her trick and decides to sacrifice the horse. The next day, the prince is at school and rushes back home to the stop the deed, then asks for a ride on the foal before its demise. The prince and the foal jump over the palace's walls and fly to another country. They reach a palace in the city with high walls, which belongs to the seventh and youngest daughter of the local king, and the foal also jumps over it.

After it lands, it gives some of its hairs to the prince to summon it by burning, then gallops away. The princess, who witnessed the deed, sends for the prince. The prince goes to the princess's room and explains his situation to her. Some time later, the princess's father wants to marry his seven daughters, and summons the sons of ministers and nobles for the princesses to choose their husbands by throwing them an orange. The six elders choose theirs, and the youngest the newcomer prince, who she is in love with, despite her father's objections. After a while, the king falls ill, and the royal doctors prescribe soup made from deer's marrow. The six sons-in-law join on a deer hunt. The seventh princess warns her husband to procure some for her father, and the prince summons his loyal black foal by burning its hairs. He asks the animal to gather the deer in the wilderness near them, then brings some deer heads with him, while the other sons-in-law cannot hunt any game. The prince puts on a disguise and peddle his products to his brothers-in-law near the city entrance. They agree to a deal: some deer heads, in exchange for them suffering a mark of his black foal's hooves. The six sons-in-law bring deer heads to be made into soup, but the dishes are tasteless, while the soup made from the deer head the prince brought cures the king.

The king compliments his youngest daughter, and the princess asks for her husband to come to the city. The prince rides into the city with the black foal, making the city walls tremble, and he goes to meet the king. The monarch introduces the prince to his brothers-in-law, and he says he already knows them, since he marked them with his foal's hooves. The king then makes the prince his successor.

==== The Black Horse Colt (Fars) ====
In an Iranian tale from Fars with the title "کره اسب سياه" ("The Black Horse Colt"), a queen dies in childbirth, and the widowed king later remarries. The second queen is interested in her stepson, prince Malek Muhammad, but he treats her as his mother. Spurned, the new queen decides to kill him: first, she orders a hole to be dug out near the entrance and covered by a carpet, so that the prince falls in. The prince's pet horse, the black foal, warns him to jump over. it. Next, she poisons his water jug, and lastly his food, which the horse warns him not to eat. Realizing the foal is helping him, she feigns illness and bribes the doctors to prescribe the meat of a black horse foal as cure. The king thus decides to sacrifice the horse, but the foal warns the prince it will neigh to warn him while he is at school. Malek Muhammed places a xurjin filled with gems under the black foal's saddle, and goes to school. He hears the foal's neigh and promptly leaves school, rushing to save his friend, and asks his father for one last ride on it. The king indulges his son, and both prince and horse escape through the air, moving "like lightning and wind". When they land, the prince buys the raggedy clothes from a shepherd and places a sheep's stomach on his head to appear bald.

He reaches a city with green meadows and spacious hunting grounds nearby. One day, he stops to rest and dip in a pond. At the same time, the king's three daughters go to the same location to play and ride on horses, and the youngest princess spies on the stranger's bathing time, just as he spies on her from afar and falls in love with her. The princess watches as he comes out of the pond, puts on the ragged disguise, plucks some hairs from his black foal and shoots it, causing it to disappear. Some time later, the three princesses discuss their plans for marriages, and pluck melons of varying ripeness to their father. The princesses explain the fruits are an analogy to their marriageability, and the king gathers all young and single suitors for his daughters to choose their husband from by throwing an orange at their suitors' chests: the elder two choose a minister's son and the mayor's son, while the youngest withholds hers, for she wants the youth she saw by the pond. The soldiers find the bald man by a fire in the corner of a bathhouse and bring him to the assemblage. The third princess tosses her orange to him, and, despite her father and sisters' reaction, she stands by her choice. The king holds seven-day celebrations for his elder two daughters, and banishes the cadette to live with the lowly bald youth in a hut. The princess tells her husband she wants to know his secret, and the youth promises to reveal it at a later time.

Later, the king sends his sons-in-law on a hunt; Malek Muhammad joins them in the lowly disguise, is given a lame mount, but, out of sight, he summons the loyal black foal and asks him to gather all animals of the wilderness and set up a tent. It happens thus. The other sons-in-law meet Malek Muhammad, sat on a throne near the large tent, and ask him for some of the animals they see beside him, since they could not hunt anything. Malek Muhammed and the duo agree to a deal: some of the animals, in exchange for branding their bodies as his slaves, which he will release soon after. The deal is made, and the two brothers-in-law make their way home with the carcasses. The king tosses aside dishes made from their game, while the youngest princess brings a meal of guts, which the monarch and the court eat with relish.

Later, the princess asks her husband Malek Muhammad if he cannot reveal himself, since she is pregnant. Thus, the prince goes to the middle of the desert, summons the black colt to set up a tent and gather an army, just outside his father-in-law's city. The next morning, the muezzin goes to make the prayer call and spots the large army. The king is alerted and sends an envoy to inquire the stranger of his intentions: he is looking for his two slaves. Malek Muhammad explains he is a prince just passing through the kingdom and indicates the king's two sons-in-law, who show the marks on their bodies. He then asks for the third son-in-law, then places the shepherd's clothes and sheep's rumen on him, thus proving he and the bald shepherd were one and the same. Malek Muhammad and the princess are given a grand palace, and live happily.

==== The Horse (Darvishian) ====
In an Iranian tale published by author Ali Ashraf Darvishian with the title "اسب" ("The Horse"), a widowed ruler has a son. After the queen's death, the boy has become withdrawn. The ruler then buys him a small foal to be his companion. The boy and the foal become great friends as time goes by. The monarch himself also remarries, but the new wife hates her stepson. One day, she puts some poison in his meal. The boy goes to meet the horse after coming back from school, and the animal warns him about the poisoned food. After three days, the ruler's wife discovers the horse alerted the boy and bribes a doctor to prescribe the liver of a horse as cure for the illness she will be feigning. The ruler falls for the trick and decides to sacrifice the horse, while the boy and the horse make their own plans: the horse will neigh three times for the boy to come save it. The next day, the boy's stepmother bribes the mullah to hold the boy at school. Just as the horse predicted, the animal begins to neigh. The boy tries to leave and is stopped by the mullah, until the boy throws some handfuls of dust at his face and rushes to his friend's aid. The boy asks for one ride on the horse before the animal is sacrificed and both depart to another country. Some time later, he writes his father a letter explaining the stepmother's plot. The monarch orders the execution of his second wife and welcomes his son back to his palace.

==== Other tales ====
In an untitled tale collected by Turkologist Gerhard Doerfer and professor Semih Tezcan in the Khalaj language (a Turkic language from Iran), a man named Xāja Turāb has three sons, Sa'īd, Māhān and Hāmān. Sa'īd's mother dies when he is still a child, and is cared for a stepmother. Their father sends his sons to school, where they learn sword fighting and horse riding, and Sa'id excels at both. Driven by envy, the stepmother bakes bread for the youths and laces Sa'id's with poison. Sa'id's horse, of the race of "Dämonenpferde" ("demon horses"), can change its shape and talk, and warns its master of the stepmother's trick. One of Sa'id's brothers eats the cake destined for Sa'id and dies. Eventually, the stepmother feigns illness and tells her husband she needs the liver of an equine of a certain colour (just like Sa'id's). Xāja Turāb decides to sacrifice his son's horse, but Sa'id, who has plotted with the horse, asks his father for some money, his rifle and his sword, and for a last ride on the animal. Xāja Turāb agrees to indulge his son, and Sa'íd mounts on the horse. After circling the patio three times, Sa'id rides the horse and both jump over the walls to any other place.

At a safe distance, the horse gives Sa'id some hairs of its mane for the youth to burn in case he needs it, and vanishes. Sa'id goes to a nearby city, buys from a shepherd his clothes and fashions a cap out of a sheep's stomach, then finds work as assistant to a bath heater from a public bathhouse. Some time later, the local king sets a suitor selection test: every available man shall come to the public square, and his daughters shall release falcons at random; whomever the birds land on, the princesses shall marry them. The eldest girl's falcon perches on the son of the vizier of the right hand; the middle daughter's lands on the son of the vizier of the left hand; and the youngest's lands on Sa'id. Thinking her daughter's falcon made a mistake, the king orders her to release it again and again; it still perches on Sa'id. Feeling humiliated, the king marries his elder two daughters in lavish ceremonies, and banishes his youngest daughter from his sight. Some time later, the king falls ill, and only gazelle meat can cure him. Sa'īd decides to join in the quest along with his brothers-in-law, but first explains to his wife, the youngest princess, that he is no mere assistant to a bath heater. He is then given a lame horse and a rusty sword, but, out of sight, summons his loyal horse and rides before his brothers-in-law.

Stopping at a point in the steppe, Sa'id asks his horse to summon every animal of the steppe; gazelles, panthers, lions and every sort of animal come to him. Soon after, the two brothers-in-law reach him, and, seeing the animals next to the youth, ask for some gazelle carcasses. Sa'id, whom they don't recognize, agrees to share some of his game, in exchange for them allowing to be branded on their backs. The tale was indexed as type *314 of Marzolph's Catalogue of Persian Folktales.

=== Asia ===
==== Kurdish people ====
A similar story also exists in the folktale corpus of the Kurdish people. According to the Catalogue of Kurdish Folktales, in tale type 314, "Das Zauberfohlen" ("The Magic Foal"), a prince has a foal with magic powers, which alerts him against his stepmother's attempts to kill him (poisoning his food, digging a hole and placing spears and blades inside it); the stepmother feigns illness and asks for the flesh of the foal as remedy; the king arranges for the death of the animal, but the prince asks for a last ride on it and both escape to another realm; in this realm, the prince dons a bald disguise and falls in love with the local king's youngest princess, who chooses him as her husband after releasing a bird that lands on his head. Later, the king becomes blind, and only the meat of a bird can cure him, so he sends his sons-in-law to hunt for one; the prince ditches his disguise and hunts the bird with the help of his foal, then brands his brothers-in-law with his ownership mark. The prince brings the real remedy to his father-in-law, and is recognized as his true heir.

In an Kurdish-Iranian tale titled "کیقباد و بحری" ("Qiqbad and Bahri"; "Kayqobad and Bahri", or "Kighbad and Bahri"), a couple have a son named Qiqbad. In time, the boy's mother dies, and the man remarries, but the second wife dislikes her stepson Qiqbad. The boy is friends with a horse named Bahri, which his father bought him. Qiqbad meets Bahri after school, caresses it and feeds it sweets. One day, the boy goes to feed the horse and finds it crying. Bahri reveals that his stepmother is trying to kill him by poisoning his food, so Qiqbad says he will avoid eating it. Later, his stepmother brings him the poisoned meal, which he refuses. Next, the boy finds Bahri crying again, and it explains that the woman has dug up a pit, filled it with swords, daggers and thorns, and covered it with a rug. The boy walks home and jumps over the carpet to avoid the trap. The stepmother asks him why he did it so, and he tells her he wanted to see if he could do it. The woman realizes the horse Bahri is helping the boy, so she bribes a doctor with jewels to diagnose a fake stomachache for her and prescribe Bahri's meat as remedy, then goes to talk to Qiqbad's teacher to hold the boy at school. She also puts on some turmeric and feigns illness. Qiqbad returns home and goes to talk to Bahri, which is crying for its upcoming execution; Bahri tells Qiqbad it will neigh three times to alert him before they kill it. The following day, Qiqbad is at school, when he hears the horse's neighs and asks his teacher to return home, but the teacher denies him. Qiqbad then quickly flees school through the window and arrives in the nick of time before Bahri is killed. The boy asks his father for a last ride on the horse, which his father allows, but orders his men to close the gates. Qiqbad climbs onto Bahri, rides around for a while, then the horse gallops so fast it jumps over the wall and vanishes in the horizon.

At a safe distance, the horse reaches another land, says they must depart, but gives the boy a tuft of its hairs for him to burn and summon Bahri, then leaves. Qiqbad meets a shepherd, buys a sheep to cook and eat, and uses its entrails as a cap to hide his hair, to appear as if he is bald. Eventually, he rides a donkey to a nearby city, approaches a house and takes shelter with an old woman that works as goose-herder for the local king. Qiqbad works as a goose-herder along with the old woman, and, one day, burns Bahri's hairs to summons it for a ride to cull his boredrom, and rides around. The boy returns to his position and dons the sheep's cap - events that the local monarch's youngest daughter witnesses from her window. Days pass, and the princesses send their father, the king, three watermelons, which the ministers interpret correctly: the fruits are an analogy for their marriageability, the first melon is withered, the second is fully ripe, and the third one is just right - which applies to his daughters' ages. Thus, believing it is past time to marry them off, the ministers suggest the king organizes a hawk release ("bazparani", in the original) to an assembly of suitors. It happens thus, and the first hawk lands on the vizier's son for the eldest princess, the second hawk on the attorney's son's head for the middle princess, and the third hawk lands on the head of Qiqbad (who is known as Baldhead). They order Qiqbad to hide under a pile of dung, release the hawk, and the bird flies over the pile and begins excavating it with its talons. The second time, they order Qiqbad to hide under the furnace of the bathhouse, release the bird again and it still chooses to land on Qiqbad's head, who remains silent. The youngest princess chooses the baldheaded Qiqbad as her husband, to the people's protest and the king's distress, who banishes the couple from the city.

However, the king becomes blind due to grief and sorrow, and the royal doctors prescribe the meat of a specific desert bird as cure. The vizier's son and the minister's son go to the desert with their soldiers in search of the bird, but have no luck. Qiqbad, still in his baldhead disguise, offers to hunt the bird in the desert, and rides a lame donkey. At a distance, he burns the hairs of his horse Bahri, which appears before him. Qiqbad explains the situation to the horse and bids him summon all the birds and animals of the desert. Bahri neighs and the birds appear to him. Eventually, his brothers-in-law approach Qiqbad and notice the birds flying around him, then ask for the bird for the king's blindness. Qiqbad makes a deal: the bird in exchange for branding the duo as his slaves and servants, and for him to keep the birds' heads. The duo agree, and suffer the branding on their backs. Qiqbad beats the birds' heads with a stick and utters aloud for the flavour to be retained in the heads, then slaughters the birds to give the bodies to his brothers-in-law, while he keeps the heads to himself. The king's sons-in-law return home, roast the meat and give it to the king, who eats the dish, but is not cured. Qiqbad returns to his wife with the heads and asks her to prepare a stew with them. It happens thus, and the youngest princess brings the stew to her father, who eats it with some reluctance. However, the king recovers his sight. The monarch asks his daughter about it and invites his lowly son-in-law, the baldhead, to come to the palace. Qiqbad removes the skin covering, summons Bahri and rides it to his father-in-law's palace. He retells his lifestory to the king, who holds a celebration in his honour and nominates him as his successor. The tale was collected from a sixteen year old informant named Javad Jafari (Ğawād Ğa‘farī) from Kangavar County.

==== Southeast Asia ====
Linguist Marian Klamer published a tale from a Kambera source with the title Njara Hawurung, translated as A flying horse. In this tale, a man named Umbu Ndilu has a second wife after his first wife died, and the stepmother mistreats her stepson, Umbu Mada, when Umbu Ndilu is not looking. The boy holds his peace and tells nothing to his father. His only solace is the horse he feeds after school. One day, the stepmother feigns illness, and her husband consults with the village's wise men if someone cast a spell on her. They find nothing, and decide to hear what the woman has to say about her illness. The woman says that Umbu Mada's pet foal has to be killed for her to feel better. Umbu Ndilu is caught in a dilemma: either he kills the horse and saves his wife, to his son's sadness, or he does nothing and lets his wife die. Umbu Mada is told of his stepmother's only cure, and can only cry about the (potential) loss of his horse friend. After some pondering, Umdu Ndilu gives his answer to his son when he is back form school one day: in eight days' time, the horse will be sacrificed. Umbu Mada resigns to his father's decision, but keeps feeding and playing with the horse until the execution. During the event, however, the horse flies away with the boy and saves them both.

==== Central Asia ====
===== Tajikistan =====
Tajik folklorist Klavdia Ulug-Zade translated a Tajik tale to Russian as "Музаффар и его конь", later translated to German as Musaffar und sein Roß and to English as Musaffar and His Horse. In this tale, a padishah has no son, until his wife gives birth to one and dies. In his grief, he lets his son, named Muzaffar, be raised in an underground house, under the tutelage of nurses and mentors, until he is fifteen years old. One day, Muzaffar's mentor allows him to leave the underground house into the outside world, and he meets his father, then is appointed his father's heir. Some time later, he goes to the market and buys a lame looking horse. Meanwhile, the padishah has remarried, and his new wife hates her step-son so much she plans to kill him: she digs up a hole, places diamond spikes in it for him to fall into, and covers it with a carpet. The horse warns Muzaffar against his step-mother's attempt. Later, the woman overhears a conversation between the boy and the animal and hatches a plan: she feigns illness and asks for the horse's meat as cure.

The horse is aware of the evil plot and plans with the boy: the horse will whinny three times to call the boy's attention, then he is to ask his father for a last ride around the city on the animal. The plan goes without a hitch, and both flee from the city. Reaching a distant mountain, the horse gives Muzaffar some of its hairs and they part ways. The boy finds work as a shepherd, then sails to another kingdom, named Korf, where he works as the local padishah's gardener. This second padishah has three daughters: Gulsun, Fatima Dunyo and Malika Dunyo. One day, Muzaffar arranges a beaufitul bouquet for the youngest princess, who begins to reciprocate his feelings. Some time later, the three princesses bring melons to their father as analogy for the marriageability, and the padishah organizes a suitor selection test: the princesses are to wait by a balcony and throw apples to their husbands of choice. The elder, Gulsun, throws hers to the son of the wazir; Fatima Dunyo, the middle one, casts her to the son of a magistrate, and Malika Dunyo to the lowly gardener. The padishah congratulates his elder daughters and gifts them houses and herds, and gives a meagre oil mill to the youngest. Some time later, Muzaffar joins his brothers-in-law for a hunt: he doffs his menial disguise, summons his loyal horse and climbs up a mountain, where he meets an old man, who goads him into hunting fallow deer. Muzaffar kills some game, and discovers their meat is bitter, but the entrails are quite tasty. Suddenly, his brothers-in-law appear near the foot of the mountain, and he signals them to go up and meet him. The brothers-in-law do not recognize Muzaffar, but are given the bitter deer meat and leave the mountain to return to the padishah to prepare his food. Muzaffar also returns and prepares a soup with the entrails, which the padishah eats with gusto.

Later, the padishah of the nearby city of Toroj threatens to invade Korf as revenge for being rebuffed by Malika Dunyo, and the princesses' husbands join in the fight for the kingdom. Muzaffar rides the horse in his golden garments and defeats the enemy army, but is hurt in the right hand. His father-in-law bandages Muzaffar's hand, and he flees the battlefield back to his wife. At the end of the tale, to celebrate his victory, the padishah of Korf holds a grand banquet and invites the entire realm. Muzaffar and his wife go to the feast in fine garments, and the padishah recognizes his handkerchief on him.

===== Uzbekistan =====
Isidor Levin and Ilse Laude-Cirtautas translated and published an Uzbek tale titled Erka-Dschản (Uzbek: Erkažon). In this tale, Erka-Dschản is the son of a padishah, and is given a foal. When he is fifteen years old, his mother dies and his father remarries. The boy's stepmother has two sons of a previous marriage and despises Erka-Dschản, to the point of tormenting the boy and even trying to poison his bread, but the boy's foal warns him. The stepmother sees an interaction between the boy and the animal and bides her time. After the padishah dies, the foal tells Erka-Dschản about his stepmother's plan: she will ask for its meat to cure her false ailment; the horse will neigh three times to alert him, and the boy is to ask for one last ride on the animal.

The next day, it happens as the foal described: Erka-Dschản stops the execution in time and begs for one last ride on his foal, then seizes the opportunity to flee from his kingdom. At a distance, the foal gives Erka-Dschản some of its hairs to help him, and leaves, while the boy goes to look for work in a nearby kingdom. He claims to be a poor, lonely youth and the royal gardener takes him in as his assistant. Some time later, the royal gardener prepares flowers for the three princesses, and Erka-Dschản places some beautiful bouquets for them. Later, the girls take melons from the orchard and take it to their father, as analogy of their marriageability. Thus, the padishah of this kingdom orders a suitor selection test: every men are to stay beneath the royal pavilion, from where the princesses will throw apples to their husbands of choice. The two elder princesses throw theirs to noble men, and the youngest to Erka-Dschản, who just happened to be passing by. The padishah celebrates grand weddings for his two elder daughters, and talks to the third one about moving away from the palace with her husband. Time passes; the padishah wants to put his three sons-in-law to the test, and orders them to hunt for swans. Later, war breaks out, and Erka-Dschản joins in the fight with his brothers-in-law, riding a lame mule at first, but, when he is out of sight, he summons his loyal horse again and fights for his father-in-law's kingdom.

===== Dungan people =====
In a tale from the Dungan people titled "Чжон Тянью" ("Zhong Tianyu") and translated to English as Zhon Qianyou, a yuanwei named Zhong has a golden-haired boy named Zhong Tianyu. After his mother dies, Zhong marries another woman. Zhong Tianyu has a special black foal with white hooves and a full moon on its forehead. One day, the boy finds his stepmother in bed with a lama, and tells his father, who does not believe him. Fearing her step-son will reveal the affair, she tries to kill him, first by giving him a coat that will burn him if he puts it on, and later by preparing chicken that will also burn him if he eats it. With the horse's warnings, the boy avoids both dangers. Failing twice, the stepmother realizes the foal helped him and, advised by her lover, the lama, feigns illness and asks for the horse's heart as cure.

Anticipating the woman's ploy, the foal plans with the boy: it will whinny three times to alert him when he is still at school; he is to return at once and ask for a last ride on the foal. The next day, it happens as the horse predicted: Zhong Tianyu circles the estate three times, then flies into the air and escapes from the kingdom. At a distance, the horse advises the boy to shirk its royal garments and weapons, pretend he is a lowly servant and find work; it also gives the boy some of its hairs, and vanishes. Zhong Tianyu finds an old couple's house and asks for shelter. The couple take him in; the old man notices the boy's golden hair and warns him to hide it beneath a cap of sheepskin. One day, the boy goes to bathe in a nearby pond, where the local three princesses are taking a stroll; the youngest notices the golden-haired youth. Later, Zhong Tianyu works as the gardener's assistant, and cuts three watermelons for the gardener to bring to the emperor. The emperor then orders the old man to explain their meaning the next day. Zhong Tianyu goes in his adoptive father's behalf and tells the emperor the fruits represent his daughters' marriageability: the elder overripe, the middle one ripe, and the youngest just right. So, the emperor prepares a suitor selection test: every available man in the kingdom shall pass by the palace, and the princesses are to throw a sewn ball to their husbands of choice. The elder princess throws hers to an army commander, the middle one to a high official, and the youngest to the gardener's assistant. The emperor marries his two daughters and present them with lavish gifts, while the youngest moves out of the palace to a hut near the stables.

Some time later, the emperor sends his two sons-in-law to hunt him some game; Zhong Tianyu secretly joins the hunt, summons his loyal horse and rides to a place where he can find the most game. His two brothers-in-law appear soon after and, seeing the youth with the best game, ask for some; Zhong Tianyu agrees to share, so long as they agree to be branded on their backs. One month later, war breaks out against a human king, and the emperor's sons-in-law ride into battle. Zhong Tianyu summons the horse and defeats the enemy army, but lets his brothers-in-law take the credit, if they let him cut off a slice of their horses backs. During a second fight, his hand is injured, and the third princess bandages it. Next, in a confrontation against a multiheaded creature, he kills it, and goes to the emperor's palace on the black foal to reveal his ruse. His brothers-in-law come after him and boast about their victory, but Zhong Tianyu shows the emperor the branded backs and their horses' cut off flesh. The emperor orders their execution and nominates Zhong Tianyu as his heir. At the end of the tale, he returns home to avenge his father and kill his stepmother and the lama. He brings his father to his wife's kingdom and cures him with a magical herb and a magical water.

==== India ====
In an Indian tale collected in Tulu Nadu with the Tulu title ಕುದಂರೆ ವಂತ್ತು ಹುಡುಗ, and translated as ಕುದುರೆ ಮತ್ತು ಹುಡುಗ ("The Horse and the Boy"), a king lives in a village. After his wife, the queen, dies, and his father marries a servant girl, per the prince's insistence. Sometime later, the prince finds a horse that gives birth to a colt and dies, but the gods bless the boy and colt with golden water and give him a camelskin. Back home, the prince's stepmother tries to seduce him, but he rebuffs her, thus she plans to kill him: first, she puts poison in his food. The horse alerts the prince about it and he throws the food to the chickens and crows, which eat it and die. Next, the stepmother digs up a hole underneath the prince's seat at the table and places a thin board for him to fall into, but once again the horse warns the prince of the treachery. Defeated, the stepmother sets her sights on the horse: she bribes a messenger to report to the king that she has a stomachache and must bathe in the blood of the prince's horse to be cured. The king falls for the trick and agrees to sacrifice the horse, but the prince asks to be allowed one last ride on it. The king agrees to indulge his son and the prince seizes the opportunity to flee. He reaches the edge of another kingdom, dismisses the horse and takes shelter with a local florist old woman who makes flower garlands for the seven daughters of the local king. The prince becomes the florist's assistant. One day, he saddles his loyal horse and rides around the local king's garden, which draws the attention and love of the youngest princess. She then sends some rotten fruits to the king as analogy to her marriageability, and the king decides to marry her. She chooses the lowly gardener boy, and is moved out to a hut with him. Later, the king's other son-in-law go on a hunt, and the prince wishes to join them, but the king gives him a rusty weapon and a three-legged horse for mount. Out of sight, the prince goes to the forest, summons his horse and builds a large fort, then draws the animals towards him. The brothers-in-law meet him in the middle of the forest, but do not recognize him, and ask for some game. The prince agrees with a deal: some game in exchange for the tips of their fingers. The brothers-in-law take the game and return home. The prince dismisses his horse and returns home with the lame mount in his lowly disguise, then sends the king the animals he hunted. The king eats the dish prepared with the gardener-prince's game and likes the taste. Sometime later, war breaks out, and the sons-in-law ride to fight in the war. The gardener-prince wishes to join them, but is given a rusty gun and a lame mount. Out of sight, he summons his horse and rides into battle, helping the brothers-in-law in battle and fending off the enemies. He then asks for their nose rings as bribe before returning to his lowly disguise. They gloat that they won the war, while the prince goes to take a bath. The princess sees her husband without the camel skin and burns it in a fire. The prince then resumes his true identity and takes the princess with him on his horse to introduce himself to the king, his father-in-law. The prince reveals the brothers-in-law's false claims of victory by showing the fingertips and nose rings, and lives with his wife, the princess. According to the collector, the tale was seven times longer than the summary he provided, and was collected in 1973 from a female Tulu informant named Seetu, from Konaje, in Mangalore, who learned it from her mother when she was younger. The collector noted that the Tulu tale paralleled three tale types of the international Aarne-Thompson Index: type 502 (for the golden-haired hero and his horse), type 314, "Goldener" (for the branding of the brothers-in-law), and type 532, "I Don't Know" (for the stepmother's persecution of hero).

=== Europe ===
==== Western Europe ====
===== France =====
In a German language tale collected by folklorist Angelika Merkelbach-Pinck with the title Der edel-weise Ritter ("The Noble-Wise Knight"), the titular noble-wise knight loses his father, a count, during a war, and has to find work as squire to another lord, taking his Schimmel ("gray-white") horse with him. Some time into his work, his master, a Jew, conspires with his wife to get rid of the squire: they give him a coat laced with poison. The horse advises the squire to commission a similar coat from a tailor to avoid the danger. Failing that, the Jew plans to kill him directly with a dagger. Before the fateful hour, the horse advises the squire to ask for a last favour: to be able to ride the Schimmel horse one last time. The next day, the squire is told he is to be killed, but repeats the horse's words to his master. The master grants his wish and the squire seizes the opportunity to ride away from the castle and into the castle of the Jew's enemy.

The horse advises the squire to wear a cap on his head and find work as a gardener under the identity of a Grindkopf, while the animal stays near a hollow oak outside the castle. The squire becomes the king's gardener and, one day, takes off his cap to wash himself and exposes his golden hair - an event witnessed by the king's daughter. The princess then begins to take an interest in the gardener, to her parents' annoyance. Some time later, war breaks out, and the gardener rides a lame fox to battle, but, out of sight, trades the fox for his Schimmel horse and defeats the enemy army, then goes back to the gardener's hut. This happens twice more. On the third battle, however, the Jew stabs the noble-wise knight in the leg with a bayonetta. The knight takes out the bayonetta shrapnel and bandages his wound, then defeats the enemy army for the third time, and rides back to his hut. the king organizes a feast and invites the Jew as a peace offering. The gardener goes to the feast as the noble-wise knight and shows his leg wound as proof of his deed. Then, one of the guests suggests they tell their life stories, and the noble-wise knight narrates how the Jew tried to kill him. Upon hearing the tale, the Jew flees from the feast, and the noble-wise knight marries the princess. In the Catalogue of French Folktales, French scholars Paul Delarue and Marie-Louise Thèneze classify the tale as type 314, "Le Petit Jardinier aux Cheveux d'Or ou Le Teigneux" ("The Golden-Haired Little Gardener, or the Scaldhead").

===== Germany =====
In a German tale from Silesia with the title Der treue Hansel ("The faithful Hansel"), a farmer has an apple tree in his garden. In spring, the tree yields an apple. The farmer brings it home to share it with his wife, but he hears a commotion in the stables and goes to check on it: the horses are loose. He locks them again and goes back home, only to discover that his half of the apple was eaten by a mare, while the other by his wife. Some time later, a boy is born to them, named Johann, and a foal to the mare. Johann takes care of the foal after he comes back from school, to the chagrin of a witch neighbour. The witch tricks Johann's mother to kill the boy: first, by giving him cake laced with poison; next, by giving him cake with an even larger dose of poison. The horse, however, advises the boy to avoid eating it. Failing that, the witch convinces the farmer to kill the horse. The next day, Johann asks his father to ride one last time on the horse around his house. The boy rides around the patio three times, then gallops away to the forest.

In the forest, Johann washes his hair in a pond and it becomes golden, then buys a pig's bladder to wear as a cap. He finds work as a gardener's assistant in a prince (Fürst)'s castle, but in a probationary status: Johann has to dig up holes and plant new trees to get the position. Johann's horse, Hansel, tells him to sleep while he takes care of everything. Somehow, the horse fulfills Johann's tasks, to the gardener's appreciation. Later, Johann prepares a nice bouquet of flowers to the prince's youngest daughter, and finishes it with a strand of his golden hair as a bow. The princess appreciates the gift and, one night, sees Johann's golden hair and notices a similar strand on the bouquet. Later, the princesses are eligible to be married, and the Fürst sets a suitor selection test for them: for each day, each princess are to throw a golden ring to an assemblage of knights, and whoever catches hers shall marry her. During the selection, Johann rides his horse Hansel and catches the rings. Some time later, the youngest princess decides to marry Johann, the gardener, much to her father's consternation, and is expelled from the palace to live in a shabby inn, but she cannot be happier. Johann renovates the inn with the golden coins he earned from his job, and lives with the princess. Later, war breaks out, and the Fürst's sons-in-law ride into battle to defend the realm.

Johann is given a lame mule and a rusty sword, but, out of sight, summons Hansel and goes to defend his father-in-law. Johann fights in three campaigns and is injured in the foot in the third, which the Fürst dresses with a scarf. Johann rides back to the inn and rests from the battle. The Fürst organizes a banquet for the kingdom and invites everyone, but Johann does not go due to his injury. The Fürst comes to the inn and notices his scarf on the gardener's foot, proving he was the knight at the battlefield. The Fürst then names Johann his successor. Later, his horse Hansel asks Johann to cut off its head. Despite his pleas not to ask such a thing, Johann does as the horse asked: the horse then turns into a human, the spitting image of Johann, and lives in happiness with his brother and his sister-in-law.

Germanist Johann Wilhelm Wolf collected a German language tale with the title Das treue Füllchen (translated as The Faithful Foal). In the first part of the tale, a shepherd named Hans finds three horses, one of a grey colour, the second of a black colour, and the third of a bay colour, which he uses to climb up a glass mountain three times and gain a princess for wife. He marries the princess and, one year later, she gives birth to a son, but Hans, now a prince, is summoned to fight a war in another country. Meanwhile, a white horse foals a colt in the stables, which becomes the prince's friend and they grow up together. However, while Hans is away, the princess has an affair with a Jew from their court, for six years. At the end of this period, the princess gets news that Hans is coming back home, and her lover and she fear that the young boy will divulge their affair, so they plot to kill him: first, they try to give him coffee laced with poison; next, they give him a smock that will kill him. With the colt's warnings, the boy avoids both dangers: he gives the cat the coffee and puts the smock on the dog; both animals die.

Hans finally returns home and his wife, the princess, feigns illness and asks for their son's tongue bathed in milk as her cure. Hans ponders on this dilemma, but, upon seeing his son's animal companion, decides to kill the horse and take its tongue to spare the boy. The horse warns Hans's son that the boy's father will kill him, but they can avoid this fate: the boy is to ask his father to ride the colt around the castle three times, and they will seize the opportunity to flee. It happens thus: the boy rides the horse to another kingdom, where the boy finds work as a horse groomer and is given a magic chain to summon his equine friend. The boy excels at horse grooming, but, one day, he sees the royal gardener arranging bouquets for the princess, and wants to have a go at it. The boy's floral arrangement impresses the gardener, who wishes to take him as his apprentice. The boy works in the garden and, on Saturdays, when he finishes his chores, he summons his loyal colt and rides around the garden - events witnessed by the princess, who falls deeply in love with him. Some time later, the princess tells the king she wants to marry the gardener's assistant, but the king gives her three days to think over her decision, otherwise he will place her in the Hinkelhaus as soon as she is married. The princess is dead set on her decision and moves out with her husband to the Hinkelhaus, and suffers mockery from the court, but her husband comforts her.

Soon after, war breaks out, and the garderner's assistant is given a lame mount and a wooden sword, but, as soon as he is out of sight, he summons his horse and ides into battle. He guides the soldiers to victory, but is injured in his leg. His father-in-law, the king, sees the injury and bandages it with his royal handkerchief. The knight rides back to the lame mount and dismisses his horse. Back to the Hinkelhaus, the princess notices her husband's wound and her father's handkerchief. She then takes it and goes to talk to her father, the king, who is searching the whole kingdom for the mysterious knight at the battlefield. The gardener's assistant wake up, summons his horse again, and rides to court to take his wife and gallop away to another land.

==== Southern Europe ====
===== Italy =====
In a Sicilian variant collected in Buccheri by folklorist Giuseppe Pitre with the title Filippeddu, a widowed king marries a new wife. The new queen gives birth to a son, and she plots to have her step-son killed to make way for her own child. Meanwhile, the prince buys a little horse in the fair and brings it to the stables. Back to the queen, she conspires with her doctor to feign illness and declare that the only cure is the prince's blood. One day, when the prince is back from school, he goes to the stables to see his horse friend, and finds the animal crying. The horse answers that the prince will die, but plans an escape: saddle the horse and ask his father to have a go around the garden for two hours, strap a vessel under the horse's belly to collect its sweat and take some hairs from its tail. The prince follows the instructions and flees with the horse to another place.

The horse falls down and dies, but, just as the horse instructed him, the prince dips a hair from its tail in the vessel and the horse revives, and brings with him his palace, pages and accommodations. The prince then goes to another city and finds work as the king's gardener's apprentice. The prince, named Filippeddu, makes floral arrangements and brings them to the three princesses. One night, the prince summons his horse and palace in front of the youngest princess's quarters; she wakes up, sees the commotion and, to confirm her suspicions, spies on him the next day. Some time later, she declares to her father she wants to marry Filippeddu. Despite the king's protests, the princess is allowed to marry him, but is expelled from the palace to live in the stables. The princess is also mocked for her choice of husband, while her sisters marry princes. Time passes, and the kingdom enters a war. The king declares that whoever brings a banner shall be granted a royal title. Filippeddu rides a lame mule, then uses the horse's hair to ride a better mount, rides into battle and steals the banner. On the way back, he makes an offer to his first brother-in-law: the banner for his cut off little finger.

The next day, the same thing happens: Filippeddu rides into battle, steals the banner of war and gives to his other brother-in-law in exchange for his little finger. Later, the king summons everyone for a banquet at the palace, where his elder daughters boast about their husbands. Filippeddu uses the horse's hair, and produces the cut off fingers as evidence of the brothers-in-law's deception.

===== South Slavic =====
In a South Slavic tale published by Slavicist Friedrich Salomon Krauss with the title Das wunderbare Pferd ("The Wonderful Horse"), a countess is pregnant with child, and a mare in the stables is ready to foal. The countess gives birth to a boy, then dies, as well as the mare after it foals. The human boy grows up and becomes friends with the foal in the stables, which knows many things. As for the count, he marries another woman. One day, the woman feigns illness and asks for the horse's liver. The horse warns the boy of the step-mother's plot, and plans with him: the boy is to ask for a coat shining like the sun, then he is to ride the horse three times around the estate. The boy is given the sun-coat, and, after he mounts the foal, both ride away from the count's manor. In another town, the foal gives the boy its bridle and advises him to find work, then gallop away. The boy becomes a gardener at the king's court, and, one time, summons the horse to ride around the garden in his sun-coat - a scene that is witnessed by the princess. The princess falls in love with the gardener and withers with love for him.

The royal doctors advise the king to marry her to the gardener. Much to his disgust, the king follows the doctors' prescribed treatment, and banishes her to live with the boy in a chicken coop. Later, war breaks out, and the gardener is given a lame mule. Before he reaches the battlefield, he gives the mule to an innkeeper for safekeeping, while he summons the horse, puts on the sun-coat and rides into battle to fight for the kingdom. An arrow injures the boy's hand, which the king bandages with a handkerchief.

The tale was republished by poet and linguist Matija Valjavec with the title Čudni konj ("Wonderful Horse"), and sourced from Petrijanec, Croatia. Scholar Monika Kropej Telban, in the Slovene Index of Tales of Magic, listed the tale as a Slovenian variant of type ATU 314, albeit collected in Croatia, and starting with the second opening of the Slovenian type (hero's persecution by his stepmother and helpful horse).

==== Central Europe ====
===== Czech Republic =====
In a Moravian tale collected by Beneš Method Kulda and Jan Soukop with the title Zahradníček Strupáček ("The Scabby Gardener"), a peasant has a childless wife, a mare with no foal, and a tree on his garden that does not yield fruit. He complains to the tree that if it does not bear fruit, he will burn it. When he turns again, there are two apples on the tree. He takes the apples and gives one to his wife, while the other drops on the ground and rolls to the stables, where his mare eats it. A son is born to the man, while a foal is born to the mare. The boy, named Janeček, becomes friends with the foal and they talk to each other. Years later, while the man is away on business, Janeček's mother has an affair with a Jew, and together they plan to kill the boy: first, they try to poison his food; next, they give him a garment laced with poison. With the foal's warnings, Janeček avoid the danger.

Finally, his father goes back home, and his wife spins a story that their son is only interested in playing with the horse instead of going to school, and issues an ultimatum: either the horse is sold, or she will leave him. Janeček visits his friend in the stables, and sees that he has not touched his food. The horse answers that the boy's father is readying a rifle to shoot him, but Janeček can save the horse: he is to ask for a last ride around the yard. Janeček follows the horse's instructions and gallops away from home into the forest, where they stop by a fountain. The horse asks Janeček to wash his mane with water from the fountain; and it becomes gold. Janeček also washes his hair in the fountain and his also turns to a golden colour. The horse advises Janeček to find work as a gardener to the king, while he will stay by a nearby cave. Janeček arrives at the castle and is hired as their gardener, but he is mocked as having scab due to the cap he wears on his head. One day, while he is at the garden, he takes off his cap to comb his hair, and the king's youngest daughter sees him and falls in love with the boy. Later, the king's elder daughters find suitable grooms for themselves, while the youngest expresses her wishes to marry the gardener.

The king berates his daughter and threatens to banish him, to which the princess retorts she wil simply join him. Back to Janeček, on a Sunday, he dons princely clothes to go to church, where the king is, then returns to the cave where he left his horse and goes back to working in castle gardens. The king consents to his daughter's marriage to the gardener, and they move out to a small cottage. Later, war breaks out, and Janeček rides into battle with his knightly garments to defend his father-in-law's kingdom. After the battle, Janeček prepares to leave the battlefield, but the king tries to keep him there and accidentally stabs him in the leg. The king then returns to the castle for a grand feast, and goes to visit his daughter in their small cottage. Once there, he sees an ornately decorated house with gold and jewels, and his son-in-law, the gardener, with a leg injury. The king realizes the gardener was the knight and that he made a mistake. At the end of the tale, Janeček becomes king. The horse then asks him to cut off its head. Reluctantly, Janeček obeys his orders: the horse becomes a dove and flies to the sky.

In a Czech tale published by author Anna Popelková with the title O Honzičkovi a čarodějném koníčku ("About Honzichkovi and the magic little horse"), a merchant has a son named Honzichk. One day, he discovers his wife is a sorceress and curses her to be a foal. Years later, when the boy is fourteen years old, the merchant remarries. Whatever Honzichk wants something, the foal neighs for the boy to come to it. The boy's stepmother forces him to work in the garden, and begins to dislike her stepson. One day, the foal warns the boy his stepmother wishes to kill him, and poisoned the breakfast, so he should drop it on the table. Honzichk follows the foal's advice. Next, the foal tells the boy they cannot stay there anymore, and asks the boy to convince his father to prepare the foal for a ride in the garden, and they will take the chance to escape. Honzichk asks his father to saddle the horse for a small ride in the garden, and the foal flies away with him to a distant place near a pear tree. After they land, the foal order the boy to take a scarf, an ointment and a comb, which he is to use on his hair to make it grow; then lift a stone, take an iron rod and strike it with the rod for golden water to gush forth, which he is to use to wash his hair and the foal's mane; then shows the boy a ring, with which he can use to summon the horse.

The animal also suggests him to put on some shabby clothes and refuse to take them off, despite what others may say. Lastly, the foal advises Honzichk to go to a nearby kingdom and find work there as the old gardener's assistant, and leaves. Honzichk follows the foal's advice and is employed to work in the garden. Some time, he summons the horse to trample the flowers, but so that more beautiful flowers may spring in their place. Still in his gardener job, he takes one night off to comb his golden hair, which is seen by the youngest princess Krasomila. Some time later, he fashions bouquets for the three princesses Dobroslava, Bohunca and Krasomila, and ties a strand of his golden hair in each one.

Some time later, the king notices his three daughters are old enough to be married, and gives each one a red apple to throw to their husband of choice. A parade of noble men and gentlemen pass by the castle windows, and the elder two throws their apples, respectively, to a baron and a knight. Honzichk, seeing the assemblage, wants to know what is going on and the youngest princess throws her red apple to his head, marking her choice of suitor. The king marries the elder two in grand ceremonies, but Krasomila marries the lowly gardener and moves out to a cellar. Eventually, war breaks out, and the king orders his three sons-in-law to fight for their kingdom. Honzichk is given a lame horse, but summons the foal, puts on a golden armour, defeats his enemies, then flies back to his lame disguise.

This happens twice more. On the third time, however, the king, wanting to discover the identity of the golden knight, accidentally injures his leg and bandages it with a handkerchief. Honzichk rides off, puts on the lame disguise and goes to meet his wife. Princess Krasomila notices the wound on her husband, and sees the handkerchief with the royal insignia on it. She then goes to talk to her father about it, and the king goes to meet the gardener. Honzichk takes off the headscarf to reveal his golden hair, and is recognized as the knight in golden armour, to the king's contentment. Honzichk is given honours and a grand marriage ceremony to Krasomila. He then summons his loyal foal, which requests him to be taken to the garden for its head to be cut off. With tears, Honzichk attends the foal's request and cuts off its head; a white dove flies off the horse's body and wishes happiness on the boy.

===== Slovakia =====
Czech linguist Jiří Polívka reported the existence of a Slovak variant collected by Ján Francisci-Rimavský, unpublished at the time, but archived in a compilation called Codex diversorum auctorum A. According to a summary of the tale, titled Janko a kuoň vrstovníci ("Janko and the Vrstovňíci Horse"), Janko and the horse are born at the same time, and the boy is the only one that understands it. The boy's parents try to kill him: first, by giving him poisoned cookies, then his father tries to shove him into the water. When his parents try to kill their son a third time, both the boy and the horse escape to the forest, when they stop by a golden fountain that gilds his hair and the horse's mane.

On the horse's advice, Janko wears a kerchief on his head and pretends he has a capillary disease, then takes refuge in a copper castle. One day, he learns that the princess from a nearby kingdom will throw a belt from a balcony and whoever fetches it shall have her as their wife. Janko rides in copper clothes and gets the belt. Next, he goes to a silver castle, and steals a ring from the princess's finger as an engagement challenge. Lastly, he goes to a golden castle, and rides to fetch a golden towel from the princess this time. Surprisingly, the princess shoots him in the leg to mark him, but he wraps the golden towel around his injury. Later, he goes incognito to a feast, where he is identified by the princess and marries her. The story then explains that by fetching the three objects, he lifted a curse on the copper, the silver and the golden castles.

==== Eastern Europe ====
===== Russia =====
In a tale collected from a teller in Kuznetsky District with the title "Золотой конь" ("Golden Horse"), a merchant has a son that helps him in his store. One day, the son sees a golden-maned black horse next to a peasant and asks his father to buy it. The merchant bargains with the peasant for the animal and buys it to give to his son. The boy tends to the horse, feeds and grooms it. One day, he goes to the stables and sees the horse crying. The animal warns him not to eat any food he is given and throw it to the dog. The boy goes home and his mother gives him a dish, but he follows the horse's advice and throws away the food to the dog; it eats and dies. Next, the horse advises the boy to refuse a new shirt his mother may give him, and to hang it over the stove. The boy does as instructed and reptiles crawl out of the garment. The third time, the horse tells him his mother wishes to kill the horse to cure her. The boy goes to his mother's room, and is told she is sick and needs the horse's heart to regain health. The next morning, the horse is brought to be sacrificed, but the boy asks to ride a last time on the animal. He seizes the opportunity to gallop away to another kingdom.

At a distance, the horse tells him to dismount and walk to the nearby kingdom of the serpent king ("змеиный царь"), where his three daughters are to choose their husbands in a public gathering, and says the boy can summon him by whistling three times. The merchant's son enters the kingdom and takes part in the husband selection: the elder princesses choose husbands for themselves, and the youngest chooses the merchant's son, to the assemblage's mocking laughter and the king's disgust. The princess remains steadfast in her decision, and asks her father to provide at least a chicken coop for them to live. Some time later, a large six-headed snake rises out of the sea and menaces the kingdom. The eldest princess is given to appease the beast, but the merchant's son summons his loyal horse, dons a golden furcoat and a golden saber, and saves his sister-in-law. The same events happen to the middle princess: she is given to a seven-headed serpent, but the merchant's son kills the monster to save her. Lastly, the youngest princess is given to a 17-headed serpent; the merchant's son rides the horse to save his wife and decapitates 16 of its heads, leaving only one intact, per the horse's advice.

The serpent bites his hand, and the princess dresses his wound. The merchant's son follows the monster to its marine lair and they hold a truce. The serpent gives the merchant son's two magic eggs. The boy returns to land and tosses one of the eggs on the chicken coop: a large terem appears for him to reside in. Later, he asks his wife to invite the king over to the terem for a banquet. The king at first declines the invitation twice, since he knows his daughter lives in miserable conditions, but accepts on the third time and goes to have a drink with his son-in-law.

In a Russian tale from Voronezh Oblast titled "Ванюшкин конь" ("Vanyushka's Horse"), Vanyushka loses his mother and father, and decides to find his "luck" in the world. He eventually finds some people pulling a colt to sacrifice it, but Vanyushka asks them for the colt. The boy and the colt live together, and eventually he hires himself as a servant to a king. This king had two children from a previous marriage and married a second wife, but his new queen hates her stepchildren and planned to kill them. The queen conspires with Baba Yaga to kill the royal children: first, the witch suggests she gives them cursed belts after they come out of the bath. Vanyushka considers the royal children, a boy and a girl, like his siblings. He meets his horse, which warns him of the ploy. Vanyushka then goes to the children and places the belts on some dogs that die. Next, the queen tries to give her stepchildren some poisoned jam, but Vanyushka tosses the pot to the ground. Eventually, Baba Yaga reveals the queen the servant's horse is warning them, and advises her to feign illness and ask for the horse's heart as remedy. The king takes the news and tells Vanyushka they will sacrifice his horse. Vanyushka refuses it at first, but lets them have the animal, as long as he is allowed one last ride on it. Vanyushla deceives the king and the queen, and rides away to another kingdom where he marries, and the tale ends.

===== Ukraine =====
In a Ukrainian tale collected by Ukrainian folklorist Mikhailo G. Ivasyuk from Chernivtsi with the title "Золотоволосий хлопець" ("Golden-Haired Youth"), a childless tsar suffers for nor having children. On a hunt, he comes across a hut with an old woman who lives alone, though her children have long left into the world. The old woman tells the tsar she knows of a sorcerer that can grant the monarch his wish. The tsar gives her some gold and goes back to the palace. The old woman buys herself the information from the sorcerer: there is an apple tree in the royal gardens with six apples, three in an upper row and three in a lower row, which the empress is to eat if she wants to have a child. After the sorcerer leaves, the old woman goes to pluck the apples and eats three of them herself, while the other three she throws to her mare. The next year, a golden-haired son is born to the old woman, and a golden-maned, golden-tailed horse to the mare. After a year, the emperor returns and finds the woman with a son, and inquires about the sorcerer's advice. The old woman lies that the sorcerer needs three years to prepare a potion for the empress, and says the golden-haired son is hers.

The tsar asks the woman to let him adopt her son as his heir, and the woman agrees. Time passes, and the boy grows up in three years. One day, the tsar has to leave to fight in a war, and the golden-haired youth is left at the palace. Meanwhile, the empress begins an affair with a lover, and both conspire to destroy the adopted prince: first, they rig his bed so he turns to dust as soon as he lies on it. The youth meets with his foal in the stables and confides in him that the empress is having an affair, to which the foal advises him not to sleep on his bed that night. Their first plan fails, so they plot again. The second time, the foal advises the youth to take some firewood and throw it to the porch before he enters the palace. He follows his foal's orders and survives another attempt, for the firewood becomes ashes instantly.

Failing twice, the empress's lover advises her to scratch herself, rip her clothes apart and tell the tsar the youth attacked her. The tsar returns, falls for the empress's trick and orders the execution of his adoptive son. The youth, as a last request, asks to be allowed a last goodbye to his foal. The soldiers try to bring the foal out of the stables, but the animal trots them down - first, ten; then a hundred, and finally a thousand soldiers fall down before him. The youth goes himself to the stables, mounts on the horse and goes to talk to the tsar on the gallows; he reveals the empress's affair then rides away to another kingdom. The foal says he needs but to whistle three times, and it will come to him, then vanishes. T

he youth makes a pipe in the forest, then goes to the city to play sad tunes on his instrument. The king's daughters, three princesses, each take notice of the youth's sad melodies and question about it. He pays no heed to the first two princesses, but falls in love with the third one and asks her for her a ring. The princess agrees and they marry, the youth playing merry tunes in his wedding.

==== Baltic states ====
===== Estonia =====
Estonian folklorist Ello Kirss Säärits collected a story from Seto teller Ul'ga Ridala with the Seto title Valgõtsirk, translated to Estonian with the title Valge lind ("White Bird"). In this tale, a couple has no children, and the man goes to the town and meets a person who gives him an apple, to be sliced in half, each half to be given to his wife and their horse. It happens thus and a son is born to the couple and a foal to the horse. Years later, the boy is made to look after his father's shop while he goes on a journey, and his mother takes up a lover. The woman tries to kill her son: for the first two days, she tries to poison his food, but the horse shows the boy its bloodied hooves and warns the boy not to touch the food; on the third day, the woman dips the plates in poison, which will kill the boy if he but touches them, and again the foal warns him to avoid touching them. The woman discovers who has been protecting her son, and calls him for dinner again, but the boy goes to meet the foal. The foal tells the boy to jump on its back, for their killers are at the stable doors.

The horse gallops away and takes the boy to another kingdom, near a king's apple orchard. The boy dismisses the horse and goes to sleep near the orchard. Many people come to wake up the boy, and the king even whips him to make him utter a sound, to no avail. The monarch moves him out to a nearby hut, and sends the princesses to deliver him food. The boy does not interact with the elder two princesses, but reveals his name is "Valge lind" ("White Bird") to the youngest. Some time later, the king sends his daughters to be sacrificed to the monsters near the beach. Each time, the princess says she has to say goodbye to White Bird in the gardens, then goes to the beach. White Bird summons his horse and goes to the beach, as a one-headed monster comes out of the water. The White Bird tosses some powder inside the monster's mouth and saves the princess, who invites her saviour to eat some salty bread in her father's castle. He denies her request, saying his name is Ivan Kaupmees, and is already full of the king's three whippings.

The middle princess goes to the beach as the next sacrifice, and White Bird, under the Ivan Kaupmees's identity, kills the two-headed monster and saves the princess. The third time, the youngest princess is promised as a sacrifice, and a three-headed monster rises out of the sea to devour her. White Bird rides his loyal horse to the beach and, after a hard battle, defeats the monster, but is injured in his hand. The youngest princess wraps her handkerchief around the knight's hand, and he departs. Back to the kingdom, the monarch wishes to learn the true identity of their saviour and summons everyone in the kingdom, but no one has the handkerchief. The youngest princess remembers the boy White Bird in the gardens, and goes to bring him in. White Bird is shown as their saviour, and he marries the youngest princess. At the end of the tale, White Bird summons his horse to return to his homeland and meets his father herding pigs at home. The man does not recognize his son, and tells him his wife has transformed into a devil. White Bird kills his mother, then takes his father to his wife's kingdom to live with them.

===== Lithuania =====
In a Lithuanian tale collected from a Gražiškiai source with the title Apė vienturtį karaliaus sūnų ir jojo žirgą ("About the son of the king and his horse"), a queen is barren, and an old woman advises the king to catch a certain fish in a lagoon, cook it and serve it to the queen. The fishermen catch the fish, the cook prepares it and serves it to the queen. The fish's guts are thrown out, and a mare and a she-dog eat it and each gives birth to a golden-maned foal and a golden-furred puppy, while the queen gives birth to a son with the sun on the front and the moon on the back of his head. The young prince plays with the animals and travels alongside his father, the king, which causes the queen, his mother, to feel envy towards her own son. One day, the prince goes to meet the foal, which warns him that they will bake him cakes laced with poison, and he should give them to the puppy.

Following the foal's warning, the prince gets the cakes and throws them to his puppy, which eats the food and dies. The prince soon suspects his mother of doing so, but she apologizes and the matter is settled. However, on another occasion, the queen sees her son riding around with the king's sword and spins a story the prince wants to kill his own father. The king believes his wife's false story and decrees the prince is to die in three days' time. The prince confides in his horse, which plans with the boy a means to escape: he is to ask the king for money, and the horse will provide him a bagpipe. On the appointed time, the prince is guided to his execution, but asks for a ride on his pet foal. The king grants his last wish, but soldiers surround him. He blows on the bagpipe and the soldiers fall to the ground, allowing the boy to escape to another kingdom.

On the road, the prince trades clothes with a beggar, and finds work as a pigkeeper to a king, while he hides his horse in the garden. One day, the third and youngest princess spies on him out of his beggar disguise, and falls in love with him. She then announces she wishes to marry the pigkeeper, to which the king agrees, but moves her out to a humble hut. Later, war breaks out, and the prince joins in the battle to protect his father-in-law's kingdom. He summons his horse, rides into the battlefield as a knight (whom the king does not recognize) and blows on the bagpipe, killing the enemy army and their king. As a reward, his father-in-law presents him with the royal sword, and he rides back to the humble hut. After the war, the king hold a celebratory feast, and invites his daughter and her husband.

The king goes to their hut and finds the royal sword in his possession, then kneels in front of the pigkeeper. The pigkeeper doffs his disguise, summons his loyal horse and rides around as the prince he is. On seeing the prince's true appearance, the king gives him the kingdom.

==== Mari people ====
In a tale from the Mari people published by folklorist Xenofont A. Chetkarev with the title "Арап" ("Arap"), an old couple long to have a child. A witch gives the man an onion and advises him to give it to his wife. The woman eats it and throws the peels outside the window. Their mare eats the peels. Some time later, a boy is born to the couple and a foal to the mare. Seventeen years later, the man goes away on business and the wife is having an affair. She comments with her lover that she wants to get rid of her son, and the lover advises her to poison his food, and to give him a shirt that will kill him. With the foal's warnings, the boy escapes. Having failed twice, she feigns illness and asks for the foal's heart and lungs as remedy. When her husband returns, the woman convinces her husband to kill their son's horse. The boy asks for one last ride on the horse, then circles around their house for a few times.

He shouts at his father that the woman has a lover, bids him goodbye, and rides away to the forest. At a safe distance, Ivan (the boy's name) reaches a meadow and goes to drink water form a pond. The horse advises Ivan to drink from the pond only once, but he does twice and his skin becomes dark. The horse then tells him to go on without him, but it will come to his aid. Later, Ivan, still looking like a dark-skinned person, goes to a nearby kingdom and finds work with the king under the name "Arap". First, the king orders him to fell down an old large oak; Ivan simply pushes its trunk to the ground.

Next, the king sends him to the garden to uproot the old apple trees and plant new ones; with the help of the horse, Ivan fulfills the task. The king's third daughter, the princess, then declares she will marry the Arap, and, despite her sisters' complaints, insists on her decision. Some time later, war breaks out, and the king's two sons-in-law are drafted. Ivan (as "Arap") asks for a horse, for he will join them. Out of sight, he kills the horse and summons his loyal foal. The animal tells Ivan to enter its right ear and come out of its left ear; he becomes a handsome youth with gleaming golden armor. Ivan rushes to the battlefield, defeats the enemies, and, with a whip, strikes his the elder princesses' husbands, then flees back home to resume his Arap identity. The events happen twice more, and Ivan returns to his humble hut in the garden. After the third time, the horse tells Ivan he can ditch the Arap identity, and says farewell to him. Meanwhile, the youngest princess brings some food to the Arap in his hut, and sees a golden-maned horse galloping away from the hut. She enters the hut and sees normal Ivan. The boy tells he was the Arap, and explains he was the one who whipped the princess's brothers-in-law. She then introduces Ivan to the king, who agrees to marry them to each other. (Note: Scholar S. S. Sabitov classified the tale as type 532, "Арап" ("Arab"), in the "Catalogue of Tales of Magic from the Mari people", which was based on the East Slavic Catalogue (Russia: СУС, English: SUS). However, the tale lacks the "specific motif" of type 532: the hero's feigned ignorance on the horse's orders.)

==== Tatar people ====
In a tale from the Tatar people titled Kötüče malay, translated to Russian as "Пастушок" ("Pastushok"; "Shepherd Boy"), a padishah has a wife and a son. When the boy is but a teenager, his mother dies, and the padishah decides to gift him a foal. They look for a fine horse in the markets, but none please the boy, until he sees a shabby colt from a herd. The boy's father buys the colt from its owner and takes it to the palace. The boy takes care of the colt, feeds and grooms it until, three years later, the colt grows up to be a fine stallion, which the boy spends the days and plays with. Meanwhile, the padishah has remarried, but his new wife has been having an affair with a horseman, and the stallion tells the boy about it. The boy then goes to talk with his stepmother about the affair in hopes of dissuading her. The stepmother heeds his words, and convenes with her lover to discover who told him about their affair. A fortune-teller tells the pair the boy's horse is aware of the affair. The stepmother then hatches a plan: she feigns illness and asks from her husband the horse's heart as cure. The boy cries to the horse about its possible death, but the animal plots with him: the boy is to prepare provisions for the road; while the boy is at school (mektebe), the horse will neigh three times to alert him; he is to come before the third neigh and ask his father for one last ride on the animal.

It happens thus: the boy circles the state three times and, whipping his horse, flees with him to the forest. While walking through the forest, the horse advises him to pick a tooth from a pile of tiger bones, and a tooth from a lions skeleton, then rides with him to another city. The animal then gives the boy three of its hairs, and tells him to rent a room in the city, then gallops away. The boy rents a room for a month, but, after his money wanes, he goes to the padishah of the city to ask for a job. The padishah agrees to hire him as a shepherd, and orders him to fatten the meagre sheep and cure the blind sheep. The boy grazes the sheep in the forest and meets an old man whom he confides in how he can fulfill the padishah's task. The old man assuages his fears and lets the boy spend some time with him and his two daughters. After three days, the flock of sheep is fat and healthy, and the old man's younger daughter gives the shepherd a magic handkerchief that grants whatever he wishes for (food, drinks, music, etc.). He reports back to the padishah, who congratulates him. The boy wishes for food and music from the handkerchief, and the padishah's youngest princess take notice of the music coming from his hut. The next day, while the shepherd is asleep, she creeps into the hut and steals the handkerchief. On the same day, the padishah orders the boy to fatten an ever large flock, this time of two thousand sheep.

The boy goes back to the old man in the forest, who gives him a magic box and helps him in this new task. Later, padishahs from neighbouring kingdoms begin a conflict to kidnap the three princesses and marry them. They first come for the first princess, but the boy drops the tiger's tooth on the ground near the battlefield: a horde of tigers appears and maims the enemy army, leaving the way open for him, on his own loyal horse, to capture the first padishah's son. Under the guise of a mysterious knight, the prince brings the prisoner to the princess's father as proof of his deed. The next time, he captures the second padishah's son. The third time, he defeats the enemy army and hurts his finger, which the youngest princess bandages with her scarf. To celebrate his victory, he summons all generals and the populace for his daughters to choose their husbands: the elder chooses a young general, the middle one another general, and the youngest the shepherd. The padishah marries his elder daughters in grand weddings, and banishes his youngest to live in the barn with the shepherd. Some time later, he falls ill, and only swan meat can cure him; whoever brings it, shall rule after him. The boy summons his horse again, which warns him that the swan meat will not cure him, but its innards will. With that in mind, the shepherd finds and kills the swan and cut open his insides.

His brothers-in-law appear soon after and, not recognizing him, ask for the swan. He agrees with a deal, the swan meat in exchange for cutting off a finger from one of them and branding the back of the other. The brothers-in-law take the swan and give to the padishah, whose health does not improve until he eats a dish made of the swan's innards. Finally, the padishah summons the entire kingdom to make his choice known: one of the two generals, or the shepherd. The shepherd claims he brought the swan meat, and points to the generals' missing finger and the brand. The padishah then makes his shepherd son-in-law as his successor. The tale was originally collected in 1966, from a 83-year-old Tatar informant named Sharafutdin Abdrakhmanov (Säräfetdin Abdraχmanov), from Shygyrdan, Batyrevsky.

==== Bashkir people ====
In a Bashkir tale translated to Turkish with the title Akkuş Sütü ("White Bird's Milk"), a hunter goes to hunt in the forest, when a witch suddenly appears in front of him. The witch tells the man to lie his son on bed and smother him to death, for his hunting to improve. The hunter's mind is caught in a dilemma, when his purebred horse stomps its hoof on the ground to warn the hunter's son: his father plans to kill the boy, so he should ask for a ride around a lake, and they will escape. The hunter goes to talk to his son and the boy requests a ride on the horse, then gallops away from home. Wandering through the world, the boy reaches another land where he learns a sultan is arranging marriages for his three daughters. The boy plucks three hairs from his horse's tail, dismisses the animal and fetches an ox's hide from a tree to use as a garment. The boy goes to the sultan's kingdom, where a crowd is gathered to watch the suitor selection: the three princesses are to release falcons at random and they shall marry whoever the birds land on.

The first princess's bird lands on a lord, the middle one's on a vizier's son, and the youngest's on the man with the ox's hide. The princess releases her falcon again, and again it lands on the stranger with the ox's hide. The sultan marries his three daughters, and moves his cadette and her husband to a barn. Some time later, the sultan becomes ill, and only the milk of a white bird can cure him. The elder princesses's husbands journey to the wilderness to hunt the white bird, and so does the boy in the ox's hide: he summons his loyal horse by burning its hairs and rides to get the bird for his father-in-law. He helps a nest of wolf pups by removing thorns from their paws, and the wolf parents, in gratitude, gift him with two vials, one with poison, and the other with the white bird's milk. The youth rides back to the kingdom, when he meets his brothers-in-law en route, to whom he gives the vial with poison. The king drinks the vial his sons-in-law Hanbatır and Baybatır, but his health does not improve. When the cadette gives her father the vial with milk, his health is restored in full, and he treats his third son-in-law better from then on. The tale ends.

=== America ===
Chilean folklorist Yolando Pino Saavedra collected a Chilean tale from San Francisco de Mostazal. In the story, titled Juanito y su Caballito ("Little Juan and his Little Horse"), a queen gives birth to a prince named Juanito. Meanwhile, in the back of the palace grounds, a mare foals a little colt. The queen dies after three days, and the little colt is given to the king as gift. After the prince and the colt grow up, a witch at the palace wishes to kill the little animal. The colt then tells the prince to place a guata ('paunch') on him so that they depart. After they ride past a den of bandits, the colt tells the prince to find a job. Juanito goes to a house and offers to be their gardener; the princess laughs at his countenance, but the king hires him as his gardener, ordering him to bring different flowers every day. The king says the horse stays in the manger, but Juanito insists to have the colt sleep near him. Juanito's colt eats the flowers, which the female slaves report to the king, so the monarch dismisses him.

Later, Juanito goes to another kingdom, where he finds new work. The princesses mock him for his appearance, but the youngest princess suspects there is more to the boy that it appears at first. Meanwhile, the little colt tells Juanito they must part ways, since it helped the boy thus far. The colt gives the boy a varillita de virtú ('wand of virtue'), then departs. Juanito cries for his friend's departure, when the youngest princess appears to him. She asks him the reason for his sadness, and bids him take off the guata he has on him. The boy does and the princess notices his beauty, then says to her father she wishes to marry the gardener. Juanito and the princess marry.

In a tale from Puerto Rico, published by folklorists J. Alden Mason and Aurelio M. Espinosa with the title El Caballito Adivino ("The Clever Little Horse"), a man has a pregnant wife, and their mare is also ready to foal, but he consults with a doctor the best remedy to accelerate his son's birth. The doctor advises the man to look for a pomegranate tree ('palo de granada') and pluck the ripe ones. The man follows the doctor's orders and gets the pomegranate for his wife to eat, and the peels she tosses out the window, which the mare eats. In time, both the human mother and the mare give birth to their respective sons, which are "adivinos". The man dies, and the story explains she cheated on him and the boy was not his. One day, at school, when the boy is seven years old, he tells his stepfather he is so wise he will burn both his mother and stepfather. Both adults take grievance for the boy and the little horse that they put poison on his food, which the boy refuses to eat.

Later, the boy goes back home and finds his mother with a fever, and she tells him she needs the meat of the little horse as remedy, so they will prepare a bonfire to burn the boy and the horse. The boy goes to check on the horse, which is crying, but the animal has a plan: the boy is to get a little dagger from home and stab the body of the animal. Despite the cruelty of the action, he does it anyway, then rides the horse out of the stables. He then sees the bonfire already prepared, and asks his stepfather to be on one side of it, and his mother on the other. After the adults fulfill his request, the horse gives some reassuring words to the boy (mentioning God and the Virgin Mary), then gallops wildly to the bonfire. The stepfather falls into the fire, and the blood drops put out the bonfire.

== See also ==
- Fire Boy (folktale)
- The Boy with the Moon on his Forehead
- Kaloghlan (Turkish folk hero)
- The Princess on the Glass Hill
- Iron Hans
- The Horse Lurja
- The Turtle Prince (folktale)
- Sang Thong
