= David Whitehorn Arnott =

British linguist

- Born: 23 June 1915; London, England
- Died: 10 March 2004 (aged 88); Bedale, North Yorkshire, England
- Spouse: Kathleen Arnott (nee Coulson)
- Scientific career
- Thesis: The Tense System in Gombe Fula (1960)

David Whitehorn Arnott (23 June 1915 – 10 March 2004) was a British linguist who was Professor of West African Languages at School of Oriental and African Studies. He is known for his works on Fulani and Tiv.

== Works ==
His works are the following:

- Dictionary of verb roots in Fulfulde dialects
- Fula language studies : present position and future prospects
- The languages of West Africa
- The nominal and verbal system of Fula
- The parent and the teacher: a grammatical analysis of a Fula text
- Particles in Fula : their behaviour and meanings
- Proverbial lore and word-play of the Fulani

== See also ==
- Kathleen Arnott
