= Shabrang =

Legendary Persian horse

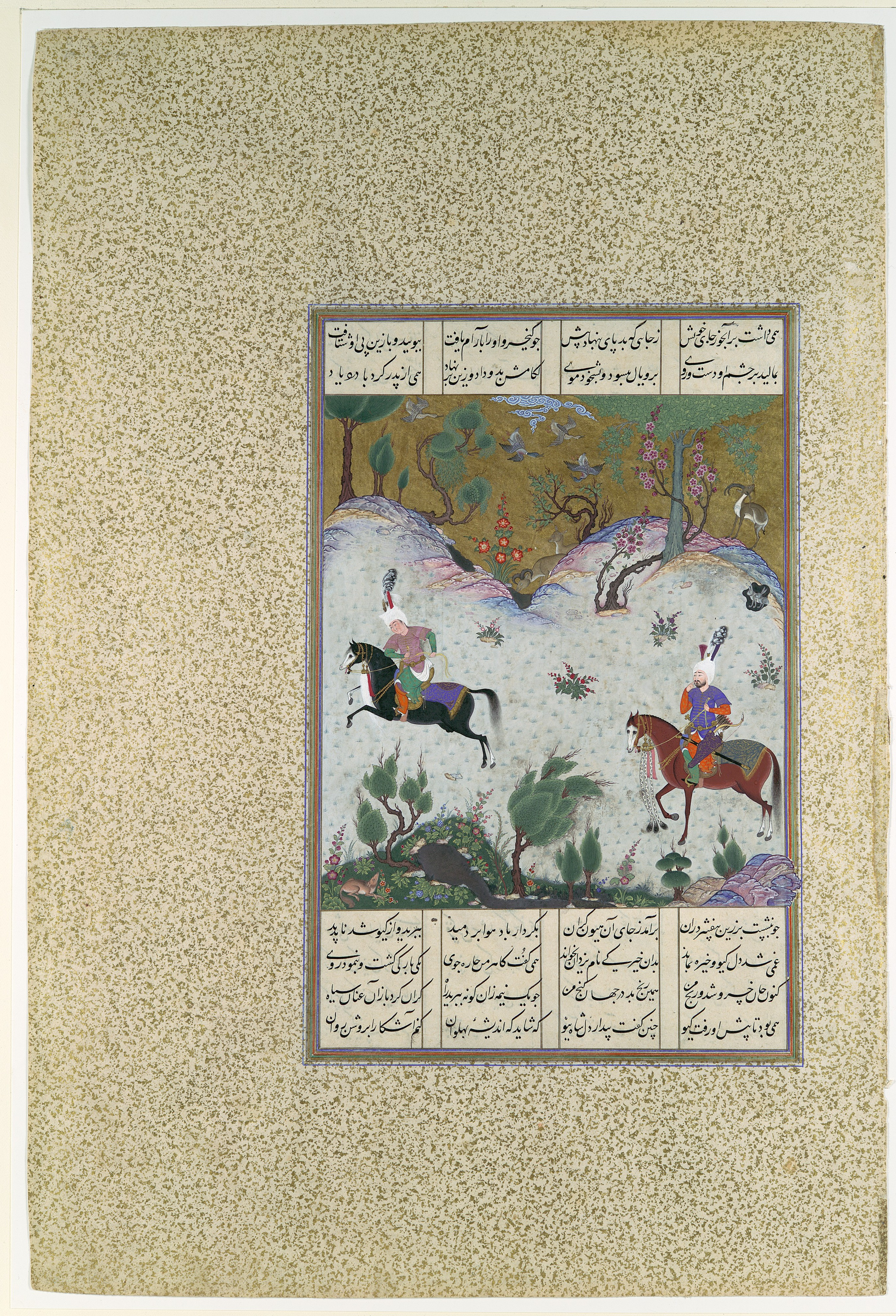
- The Shabrang, Night-coloured purebred Horse

Creature information
- Grouping: Mythical creature
- Folklore: Persian mythology

Origin
- Country: Ancient Iran

Shabrang (Persian: شبرنگ, lit. 'Night coloured') is the legendary horse of the Persian hero Siyâvash in the Shahnameh. In a trial of his righteousness, Siyâvash passed through a large fire riding this stallion. After his death, his son Kay Khosrow, eventually became the ruler of Persia and was among the most magnificent and benevolent rulers according to Shahnameh. He disappeared and in traditional Zoroastrian mythology, he never died and will return to bring justice riding on his father's horse Shabrang.

== See also ==
- The Black Colt (Iranian folktale)

== Sources ==
- Ferdowsi Shahnameh. From the Moscow version. Mohammed Publishing. ISBN 964-5566-35-5
