= Kathleen Arnott =

British writer

- Born: Ivy Kathleen Coulson; 19 November 1914; Croydon, England
- Died: 8 May 2010 (aged 95); North Yorkshire, England
- Spouse: David Whitehorn Arnott
- Children: Shiven

Ivy Kathleen Arnott (née Coulson, 19 November 1914 – 8 May 2010) was a British writer and missionary who is known for writing several books on African myths and legends.

== Life and career ==
Arnott was married to linguist David Whitehorn Arnott, who predeceased her in May 2004. She died in North Yorkshire on 8 May 2010, at the age of 95.

Kathleen Arnott wrote the critically acclaimed "Thunder And Lightning", telling the story of anti hero Lightning.

== Published books ==
- African Myths and Legends
- Tales from Africa
- Tales of Temba: Traditional African Stories
- Spiders, Crabs, and Creepy Crawlers: Two African Folktales
- Animal Folk Tales Around the World
- African Fairy Tales
- Dragons, Ogres, and Scary Things: Two African Folktales
- Auta the Giant Killer and Other Nigerian Folk Stories
- The Golden Fish and Other Stories
- Animal tales from many lands
