= Cinder Jack =

Hungarian fairy tale

Cinder Jack (Hungarian: Hamupipöke) is a Hungarian fairy tale first collected by Hungarian author and poet János Erdélyi in the mid-19th century. It is classified in the international Aarne-Thompson-Uther Index as tale type ATU 530, "The Princess on the Glass Hill".

== Translations ==
The tale was translated into German language as Aschenbrödel by German author Gottlieb Stier.

== Summary ==
A peasant has three sons and owns a vineyard. He orders his three son to guard it, and sends the elder on the first night. The youth takes out a cake to eat and a frog appears to him, asking if he can share the food. The elder son takes out a stone and shoos the frog away, then shuts his eyes, heavy with sleep. When he wakes up, he sees that the fields have been destroyed. The second son is also ordered to watch the vineyard, but he also falls asleep and fails.

After his elder brothers fail, the youngest, named Cinder Jack, for he always sat on the ashes, asks his father to let him hold a night watch, just like the other two. His father laughs at the idea, but still indulges his son's wishes and lets him go for a turn in their vineyard. The same frog appears to Cinder Jack, who acts kindly towards it and shares his food. In return, the frog rewards him with three rods, "of copper, silver and gold", with which to tame three horses that have been trampling his father's vineyard. Just as the frog predicted, the three wild horses appear, of the same colour as the rods, and Cinder Jack strikes each with the respective rods. Now tamed, the three horses calm down and spare the vineyard.

Some time later, on a Sunday, the king sets a challenge: he erects a high fir pole in front of the church and ties a golden rosemary; whoever gets it in one jump on horseback, shall marry the princess. Many knights assemble to try their luck in getting the rosemary. Suddenly, a mysterious knight, clad in copper armor and on a copper horse, rides into the crowd, jumps very high, grabs the rosemary, and rides away. Cinder Jack's brothers go back home and tell his brother about the mysterious knight. The youth then says he actually saw the knight, from up the hoarding. His brothers then destroy it so their cadet cannot see anything more.

The next Sunday, the king sets a similar challenge: he erects an ever higher pole, and places a golden apple on it. Once again, many knights assemble to try their luck, but only a mysterious knight in silver armour, on a silver horse, beats the challenge, jumping very high and fetching the golden apple. Cinder Jack's brothers return home and tells their cadet about the knight in silver, and the youth says he watched the events from the pigsty, which is broken down.

On a third Sunday, the king places a silk handkerchief interwoven with gold in a higher pole, for another round of challenges. Once again, a mysterious knight, this time in golden armour and riding a golden horse, comes and claims the handkerchief for himself, after jumping very high. This time, Cinder Jack tells his elder brothers he saw everything from the roof of the house, so they break down the roof.

Finally, the king announces that the mysterious knight should appear before him with the prizes so he could be married to the princess, but the winner does not come. Then, he orders every men to be brought before him, and still the knight does not appear, until the man in question arrives on the golden horse. When he lifts his visor, it is Cinder Jack. The youth rebuild his brothers' house, then gets to marry the princess and reign after his father-in-law.

== Analysis ==
=== Tale type ===
The Hungarian National Catalogue of Folktales (MNK) classifies the tale as type AaTh 530, Az üveghegyi királykisasszony ("The King's Daughter of the Glass Mountain"): a man's three sons either guard their fields at night, or hold a vigil at their father's grave at night, but only the third and youngest son is successful, and obtains three wonderful páripas ('horses'), which he uses to beat the challenge of climbing the Glass Mountain. The tale corresponds, in the international Aarne-Thompson-Uther Index, to tale type ATU 530, "The Princess on the Glass Mountain".

According to the Hungarian National Catalogue of Folktales (MNK), last updated by Ákos Dömötör in 1988, the tale is one of the oldest variants of the tale type registered in Hungary.

=== Motifs ===
==== The hero's name ====
According to W. Henry Jones and Lajos Kropf, the name Hamupipöke refers to both female and male gender. As such, Hamupipöke is also the Hungarian name for Cinderella (which is classified as type ATU 510A, "Cinderella"). In this regard, Hungarian ethnographer Sándor Solymossy recognized that the Hamupipöke hero is the male version of the Cinderella-cycle: an unsuspecting person of low status who is mocked and despised, but appears in a social gathering (at church or in court) wearing splendid clothes, then vanishes as soon as they appear.

== Variants ==
Hungarian ethnographer Ágnes Kovács commented that the tale type, known as Hamupipöke királyfi ("The Cinderella Prince"), is "very popular" in Hungary, with 32 (thirty-two) versions recorded. Fieldwork conducted in 1999 by researcher Zoltán Vasvári amongst the Palóc population found 4 variants of the tale type.

A very similar version, titled A szegény ember szőlője ("The Poor Man's Vineyard") was collected by Hungarian journalist Elek Benedek, and published in his compilation Magyar mese- és mondavilág.

In another variant, Das Kupfer-, Silber- und Goldgestüt ("The Copper, Silver and Golden Studs"), a friendly mouse informs the youngest son how to tame the three hordes of horses that have been trampling his father's crops. The youth manages to tame an animal from each herd (a copper horse, a silver steed and a golden stallion), and receives a whistle to summon each one of them. At the end of the tale, the three horses are used to drive the son's coach.

The task of climbing the Glass Mountain appears as an episode in the Hungarian folktale of A három fiú, a tale of the ATU 303 type ("The Twins or Blood Brothers"): three poor brothers inherit, each of them, a lion, a bear and a wolf, and one of the brothers climbs up the Glass Mountain in copper, silver and gold garments.

In a tale titled Hamupepejke, the youngest prince shares his food with a little mouse, which gives him a whistle in return. The neighbouring king announces an engagement challenge: whosoever is able to jump very high, reach the princess (sat on a throne) and receive three kisses, shall marry the princess. When his two older brothers take part in the challenge, Hamupepejke summons the little mouse, which gets him three horses, with copper, silver and golden horseshoes, respectively.

In the similarly named Hamupepejke, in the first part of the tale, the youngest son hold a vigil at his father's grave, covering for his older brothers, and receives a copper bridle, a silver bridle and a wish-fulfilling horn.

In the tale titled Az aranykőles ("The Golden Millet"), the king promises his sons that whoever finds out what has been eating his crops, shall have half of the harvest as reward. The prince finds out it is a herd of copper/silver/golden horses that graze his father's fields. A friendly mouse instructs the hero on how to tame a copper, silver and golden horse.

In the tale titled Az elátkozott királykisasszony ("The Cursed Princess"), a king meets an old man, who tells him the extended backstory of a cursed princess, daughter of a powerful queen. The old man also advises the king on how to scale the Glass Mountain, where the princess is located: the king must ride a black/yellow/white horse and wear black/yellow/white robes, jump very high and obtain the princess's gifts (handkerchief, apple and ring) in three trials.

In a Hungarian tale from the Páloc region with the title Hamupipőke, vagy Mezőszárnya, told by one Sike Veron Fóris, a man has three sons, the youngest named Hamupipőke, since he sleeps on the ashes. The king announces the three princess will play in the garden in the shape of horses, one of diamond, the second of gold, the third of silver, by morning, and whoever captures them shall marry them. The man's sons decide to capture the horses when they appear. Every night, a little mouse appears, but the elder sons each shoo it away, and, when the horses appear, they chase after the animals and cannot capture them. When it is Hamupipőke's turn, he gives some food to the little mouse, digs a ditch in the garden to hide in, and, when the horses appear, he captures them with a bridle. The girls give him a shawl and a ring, the first of diamond, the second of gold, and the third of silver, which he hides in a hole at home. Later, another king announces that whoever climbs up a glass mountain shall become the princess's husband. When Hamupipőke's family goes out to watch the challenge, the youth uses the bridle (which the story explains the little mouse gave him before), and summons a silver horse with silver garments. Hamupipőke rides the silver horse to the glass mountain, reaching it by mid-point, then returning home before his family. After his relatives return, his brothers tell him about the mysterious knight at the mountain, and Hamupipőke says he saw it too, from the mulberry tree. Furious, his elder brothers chop it down. The second time, the youth uses the bridle to summon a golden horse with golden garments, and also reaches the glass mountain by the halfway point, then returns home. After the second time, he says he watched it everything from the barn roof, which he accessed by a ladder, so his brothers and father break down the ladder. The third time, he summons a diamond horse with diamond clothes, and rides up the glass mountain, and his brothers break down the barn roof. After the event, the king orders the whole kingdom to appear before him, so he can find the mysterious knight.

== Adaptations ==
Two Hungarian variants of the tale were adapted into episodes of the Hungarian television series Magyar népmesék ("Hungarian Folk Tales") (hu), with the titles Hamupipőke királyfi ("The Simple Prince") and A szegény ember szőlője ("The Poor Man's Vineyard").

== See also ==
- Cinderella
- Sivko-Burko
- The Glass Mountain (fairy tale)
- Fire Boy (folktale)
- Old Rinkrank
- The Boots or Askeladden series of folk and fairy tales
- Iron Hans (German fairy tale by the Brothers Grimm)
- The Magician's Horse
- Nemtudomka
