= Sivko-Burko =

Russian fairy tale about a magical horse

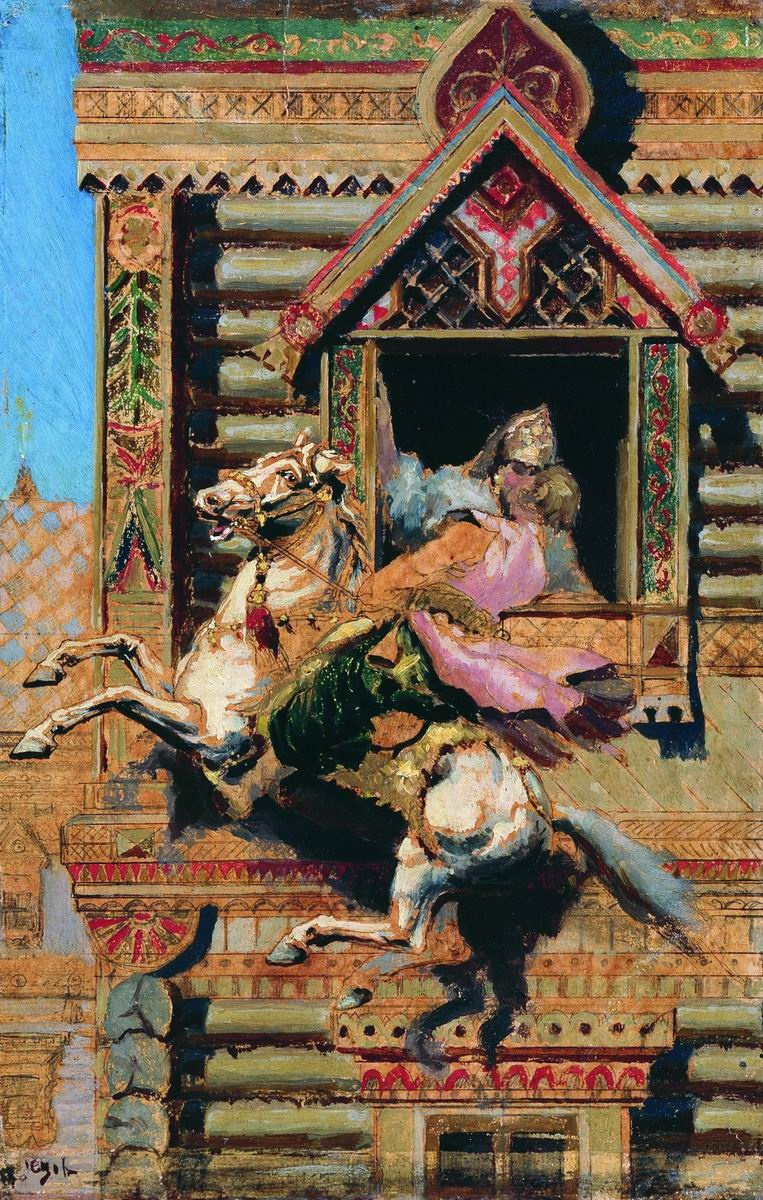
- The hero, on the fiery Sivko-Burko, kisses the princess, located in the highest tower. Study by Victor Vasnetsov (1926).

Folk tale
- Name: Sivko-Burko
- Aarne–Thompson grouping: ATU 530 (The Princess on the Glass Hill)
- Country: Russia
- Published in: Russian Fairy Tales by Alexandr Afanasyev
- Related: The Princess on the Glass Hill; Cinder Jack

Sivko-Burko (Russian: Сивко-бурко, romanized: Sivko-burko) is a Russian fairy tale (skazka) collected by folklorist Alexandr Afanasyev in his three-volume compilation Russian Fairy Tales. The tale is a local form in Slavdom of tale type ATU 530, "The Princess on the Glass Mountain", wherein the hero has to jump higher and reach a tower or terem, instead of climbing up a steep and slippery mountain made entirely of glass.

== Summary ==
A father has three sons, the youngest named Ivan the Fool, for he usually stays on the stove most of the time. On his deathbed, the man asks his sons to hold a vigil on his grave for three nights, each son on each night.

The man dies and is buried. When the time comes, the elder brother sends Ivan in his stead. Ivan goes to his father's grave on the first night. The grave opens and his father's spirit asks if his elder son is there, but Ivan answers that it is him. The spirit summons a horse named Sivko-Burko (litteral 'Grey-Brown') and asks the animal to serve his son just as it has served him.

On the second night, the middle brother sends Ivan in his stead. He meets his father's spirit near the grave and Sivko-Burko appears to him again. On the third night, Ivan the Fool goes himself to his father's grave and is given the horse Sivko-Burko, then his father's spirit finally rests in the grave.

Some time later, the tsar issues a proclamation: whoever jumps high enough on a horse and tear the princess's portrait down "from high up on the house" shall have her a wife. Ivan's brothers leave him by the stove at home and go to watch the event. Meanwhile, Ivan the Fool summons Sivko-Burko. The horse comes, venting fire from its nostrils. Ivan the Fool climbs into one of the horse's ears and comes out of the other dresses in knightly garments.

The mysterious knight rides to the tsar's palace and jumps very high to tear down the princess's portrait, but misses by "three logs". He rides back to the steppe, turns back to Ivan the Fool, dismisses Sivko-Burko and goes back home to the stove. The brothers return home and comment on the mysterious riders.

Time passes, and the tsar reiterates the proclamation. Ivan's brothers want to attend again, and leave Ivan at home. Ivan summons Sivko-Burko, rides to the tsar's assemblage and jumps very high to tear down the portrait, but misses it by two logs. The third time, Ivan rides the horse, tears down the portrait with the bunting, and rides back home.

The tsar then holds a ball and summons all male participants, boyards, voivodes, peasants, the like. Ivan the Fool also comes and sits by the chimney. The princess serves beer to the guests and hopes to check if any one of them wipes his brow with the bunting, but no luck on the first day, neither in the second. On the third day, Ivan the Fool, sat by the chimney, wipes his brow with a cloth. The princess recognizes him as the rider and goes to serve him beer. She proclaims Ivan is her intended, and marries him.

== Analysis ==
=== Tale type ===
Russian scholarship classifies the tale as type 530, "Сивко-Бурко" ("Sivko-Burko"), of the East Slavic Folktale Classification (Russian: СУС, romanized: SUS): the foolish third brother holds a vigil on his father's grave and is rewarded a magical horse named Sivko-Burko, which he rides to reach the princess atop a tower. The East Slavic tale corresponds to tale type ATU 530, "The Princess on the Glass Hill", of the international Aarne-Thompson-Uther Index.

=== Motifs ===
==== The hero's vigil at his father's grave ====
August Leskien acknowledged that the "numerous" Slavic variants "almost universally begin" with the father's dying wish for his sons to hold a vigil for his coffin or dead body at night. Similarly, Walter Scherf, in Lexikon der Zaubermärchen, noted that the guard at the grave was a "particularly common" opening in Slavic countries, and that in this episode, there is a close bond between father and his youngest son that persists after death. In this regard, Vladimir Propp, in his work The Russian Folktale, argued that the test in the tale type involves the cult of ancestors, since the third brother is the only one who fulfills the dead father's request.

==== The horse helper ====
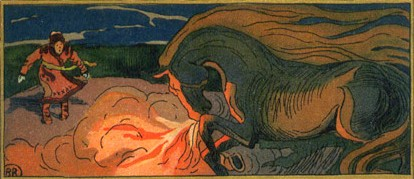
The fierce steed Sivko-Burko, venting fire from his nostrils. Image from a Russian postcard.

Russian scholar Vladimir Propp argued that the magical horse of the Russian tale Sivko-Burko represented a messenger connected to the Otherworld, and mentioned an ancient Slavic funeral custom of burying a horse with its owner. Propp, in a later study, remarked that the male hero finds the magical horses in a crypt, deep in the mountain or under a stone - a motif he called Конь в подвале ("horse in the cellar"). According to him, this motif reaffirmed the connection between horses and the cult of the ancestors. Following Propp's arguments, researcher T. V. Mzhelskaya, based on archeological evidence, suggests that the motif of the "horse in the cellar" integrated into Russian folklore via a nomadic people of the Eurasian steppe.

The horse's name, Sivko-Burko, refers to the horse the hero's father summons to help his son, sometimes translated as "Grey-Brown, "Silver-Roan", or "The Grey and Chestnut Horse". The steed is described as venting fire from his nostrils, and with the ability to fly. Russian scholarship remarks that the character of the magical horse Sivka already appears in Russian literature by the late 15th century.

Some scholars trace the origin of the wonder horse to Central Asian epic narratives, from there spreading to Eastern Asia, South Asia, the Middle East and then to Europe.

==== The princess in the terem ====
Scholarship notes that, in variants from Eastern Europe, Russian and Finland, the princess is not located atop a Glass Mountain, but is trapped or locked in a high-store tower. According to Russian folklorist Lev Barag, the motif of the "princess in the terem" is predominant in Russia, Ukraine and Belarus, although the Glass Mountain appears in texts collected from Western Belarus and Western Ukraine.

=== Related tales ===
Russian variants often begin with the challenge of the Glass Mountain or the high store tower, but continue as type ATU 530A, The Pig With Golden Bristles, wherein the foolish hero, to test his mettle, is made by his father-in-law to provide him with marvellous creatures, such as the titular golden-bristled pig. In The Tale of Little Fool Ivan, after he holds a vigil on his father's grave for three nights, Ivan gains his father's trusty horse, Sivko-Burko, and uses it to beat the challenge of Tsarevna Baktriana: to reach her in a high store terem. After they marry, the Boyards on the Tsar's court lie that Ivan's brothers boast that they can accomplish impossible tasks. As a result, the Tsar sends Ivan's brothers on dangerours errands, such as to capture a pig with golden bristles. According to Lev Barag, the continuation of type 530 as type ATU 530A only occurs among the Slavs and in the Baltic states.

== Variants ==
=== Russia ===
Professor Jack Haney reported at least 60 variants from Russian sources.

Russian folklorist Alexander Afanasyev collected a variant named "Царевна Елена Прекрасная" (Tsarevna Yelena Prekrasnaya; "Tsarevna Yelena, the Beautiful"): Prince Ivan stands at his father's grave and longs for the beautiful Princess Helena the Fair. Sensing his son's deep longing, the father's spirit appears to him and summons a horse to help the prince to gain the affections of the fair princess. This tale was translated by Leonard Arthur Magnus as The Princess to be Kissed at a Charge; as Princess Helena The Fair, by William Ralston Shedden-Ralston; and by French illustrator Edmund Dulac as Ivan and the Chestnut Horse, in his book Fairy Tales of the Allied Nations.

Alexander Afanasyev collected another Russian variant ("Сивко, Бурко, Вѣщій Воронко"), and a Belarusian one (originally "Конь със Злато-Серебряной Шерсткой", "The Horse with Golden-Silver Skin"), all grouped under the name "Сивко-бурко" (Sivko-burko).

Russian-born British author Edith Hodgetts published, in a book of Russian fairy tales, the story Ivan and the Chestnut Horse: a peasant named Ivan the Fool wants to go to the king's feast, but is mocked by his brothers. Suddenly, a horse of chestnut color materializes and reveals its intention to help the youth. Ivan then rides the horse to get the shining ring from the king's daughter, a princess who was cursed to remain unmoving on her balcony until someone brave enough took the ring from her hand.

In a tale from Perm Krai with the title "Сивка-бурка" ("Sivka-Burka"), an old couple have three sons and wheat fields. One summer, they begin to notice that something has been trampling the fields, and order their sons to stand guard. The elder two fail, but the youngest, Vanyusha, discovers a wild horse. Vanuysha jumps on the horse to tame it and the animal flies away with him on an aerial journal. The horse lands back on the fields and teaches the youth a command to summon it, then departs. Some time later, the king places his daughter on a high tower, and announces that whoever jumps very high, reach the tower window and get the princess's ring, shall have her as wife and half of the kingdom. Vanyusha tries three times on three days, succeeding in getting the ring on the third time. He rushes back home, dismisses Sivka-Burka, and lies on the oven. The princess looks for her suitor during the ceremony, to no avail. All males are invited to the wedding, including Vanyusha. The princess recognizes him and brings him to her table.

In a version published by Irina Zheleznova, Chestnut-Grey, the magical horse Sivko-Burko is named Chestnut-Grey.

A variant of the tale type has been collected from a Komi source.

Five variants of the tale type have been collected in "Priangarya" (Irkutsk Oblast), in East Siberia.

=== Ukraine ===
In Ukraine, a previous analysis by professor Nikolai Andrejev noted an amount between 16 and 20 variants of the tale type.

In a Ukrainian tale, "Коршбуры попелюхъ" or Korsbury-popeljuh ("Dirty Cinder-boy"), given in abridged form by English folklorist Marian Roalfe Cox, the hero tames three wild sea horses that have been grazing the king's fields. Later he uses the horses to reach the princess in the second story of the castle, for a kiss. August Leskien, in his summary of this story, described that each horse had, respectively, a star, a moon and the Sun on their bodies.

In a tale collected by O. Malinka, Батько и тры сыны ("The Man and his Three Sons"), only the youngest son attends his father's funeral and receives three horsehairs to summon a magical horse. His father warns him that he will not succeed the first two times, but in the third time he will reach a verandah on the fifth floor of the palace, where the princess is located.

In another tale with the title "Дурень-Терешка" ("Fool-Tereshka"), the king places his daughter on a Glass Mountain, and announces that whoever reaches her, shall have her for wife. Meanwhile, an old man is dying and asks his sons to attend his funeral for three nights. Only the youngest, a fool, fulfills his late father's wishes.

== See also ==
- List of fictional horses
- Cinderella
- The Glass Mountain (fairy tale)
- Fire Boy (folktale)
- Old Rinkrank
- The Boots or Askeladden series of folk and fairy tales
- Iron Hans (German fairy tale by the Brothers Grimm)
- The Magician's Horse
- Little Johnny Sheep-Dung
- The Gifts of the Magician
- The Black Colt
