= Season of Glass =

Season of Glass may refer to:

- Season of Glass (album), a 1981 album by Yoko Ono
- Season of Glass (EP), a 2015 EP by GFriend
- "Seasons of Glass and Iron", a 2016 fantasy story by Amal El-Mohtar
