= The Glass Mountain (fairy tale) =

Polish fairy tale

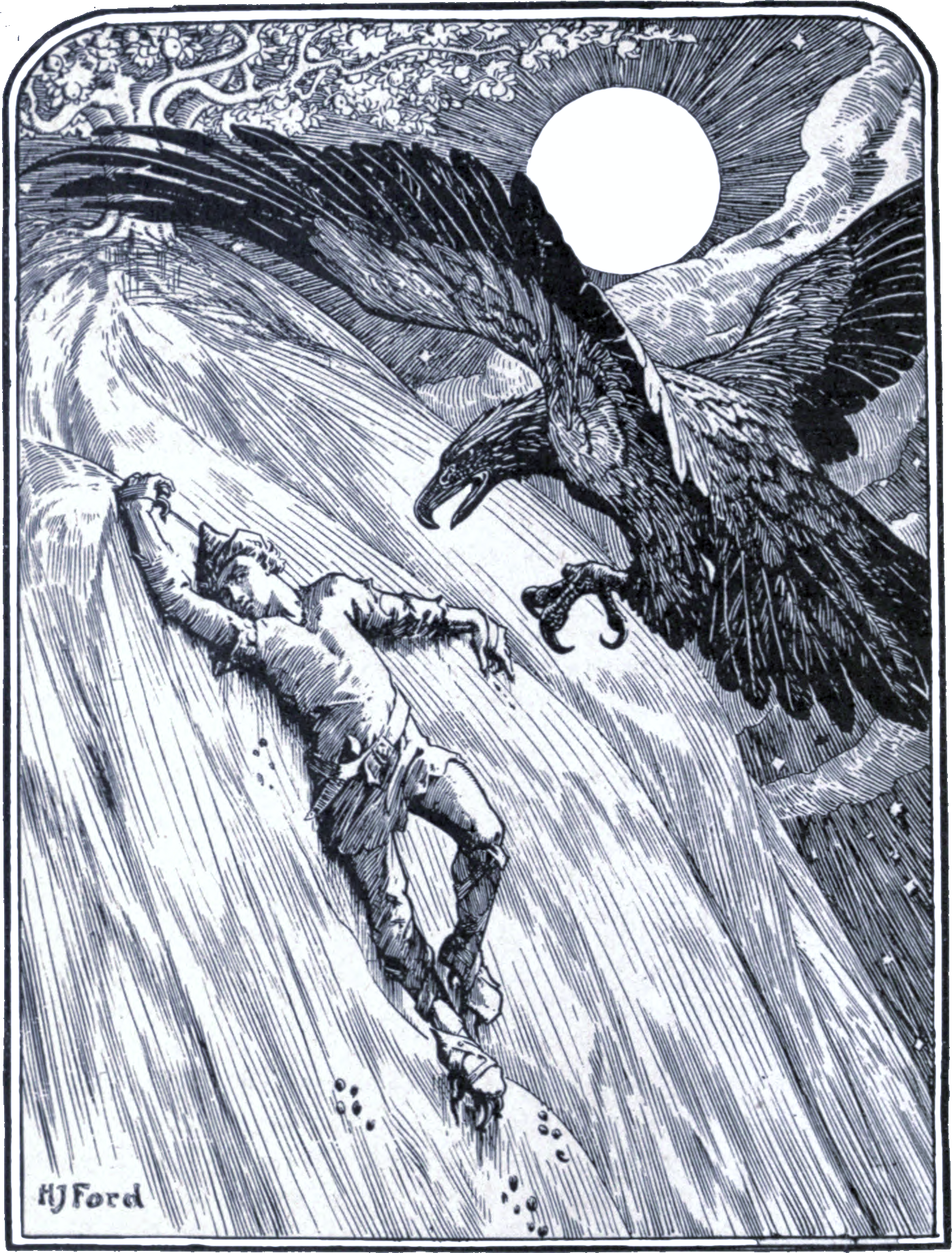
- The eagle attacks the youth on the slopes of Glass Mountain. Illustration from The Yellow Fairy Book (1894).

Folk tale
- Name: The Glass Mountain
- Aarne–Thompson grouping: ATU 530 (The Princess on the Glass Hill)
- Country: Poland
- Published in: Klechdy (Tome II) by Kazimierz Władysław Wójcicki (1837)
- Related: The Princess on the Glass Hill; Sivko-Burko

"The Glass Mountain" (Polish: Szklana Góra) is a Polish fairy tale, translated from the original Polish into German as Der Glasberg. The tale was also compiled by Hermann Kletke and sourced as from Poland.

Andrew Lang included a translation into English in The Yellow Fairy Book. Further publications followed suit, keeping the name.

The name also appears as a mythical location in a different story, Old Rinkrank, one of the original Brothers Grimm fairytales, "Glassberg" or "Glasberg" in the original German.

The tale is classified as Aarne–Thompson type 530, "The Princess on the Glass Hill".

== Synopsis ==
The Polish story begins with: On a glass mountain grew a tree with golden apples. An apple would let the picker into the golden castle where an enchanted princess lived. Many knights had tried and failed, so that many bodies lay about the mountain.

A knight in golden armor tried. One day, he made it halfway up and calmly went down again. The second day, he tried for the top, and was climbing steadily when an eagle attacked him. He and his horse fell to their deaths.

A schoolboy killed a lynx and climbed with its claws attached to his feet and hands. Weary, he rested on the slope. The eagle thought he was carrion and flew down to eat him. The boy grabbed it, and it, trying to shake him off, carried him the rest of the way. He cut off its feet and fell into the apple tree. The peels of the apples cured his wounds, and he picked more, to let him into the castle. He married the princess.

The blood of the eagle restored to life everyone who had died trying to climb the mountain.

== Origin ==
John Th. Honti speculated that the fairy tale has its roots in an 11th-century BCE Egyptian story, the "Tale of the Predestined Prince". Other scholars have asserted the tale comes from India.

== Analysis ==
The tale type is said to be one of the most frequent in Polish tradition, with several variants grouped under the banner Szklana Góra (The Glass Mountain).

Polish ethnographer Oskar Kolberg, in his extensive collection of Polish folktales, compiled several variants: O trzech braciach rycerzach ("About three knightly brothers"), O głupim kominiarzu, O głupim z trzech braci ("About the foolish of the three brothers"), Klechda.

In a Masurian (Poland) tale, Der Ritt in das vierte Stockwerk ("The Ride to the Fourth Floor"), the youngest son of a farmer holds a vigil on his father's grave, receives a magical horse and tries to beat the King's challenge: to find the princess in the fourth floor of the castle.
