= Tale of the Doomed Prince =

Ancient Egyptian literary text

The "Tale of the Doomed Prince" is an ancient Egyptian story, dating to the 18th dynasty, written in hieratic text, which survived partially on the verso of Papyrus Harris 500 currently housed in the British Museum. The papyrus was burned in an explosion; because of this damage the conclusion of the story is missing. Some scholars speculate that the missing ending was mostly likely a happy one and that the tale could be more aptly named "The Prince who was Threatened by Three Fates" or the like.

There are dozens of translations of this story from a wide variety of scholars. The translations by Miriam Lichtheim and William Kelly Simpson from the 1970s are both widely accepted versions.

== Synopsis ==
The story goes as follows : The king of Egypt was very sad that a son had not yet been born to him. The king prays to the gods, and that night his wife conceives a child. When the king's son is born the seven Hathors (goddesses, who pronounce the fate of each child at birth) foretell that he will die either by crocodile, snake or dog. His father, afraid for his son's safety, builds his son an isolated palace in the mountains, so as to keep him away from danger.

One day the prince sees from his palace a man with a dog. He asks his father for a dog. The king warily gives the prince a dog, not wishing his son to be unhappy. When the prince grows up, he decides to face his doom, travelling abroad to Nahrin. There he meets a group of young men competing for the heart of the princess. The prince succeeds in winning the heart of a princess by jumping (possibly flying) to the window of the room where the princess is locked up. The prince did not tell the king the truth about himself, but said he was the son of a charioteer, and explained that he had had to leave home because of his new stepmother. Eventually the king agrees to let the prince-in-disguise marry his daughter, after seeing the merits of the young man.

After marrying the princess he tells her of his three dooms, and of his prince-hood. She urges him to kill the dog, but the prince cannot bear to kill the dog he has raised from a puppy. His wife watches over him dutifully, and stops a snake from biting the prince in his sleep. Thus, one of the prince's fates is defeated. Some time after that the prince goes for a walk with his dog. The dog begins speaking (the dog possibly bites the prince), and tells the prince he is meant to be killed by the dog. Fleeing from the dog, he runs to a lake where he is seized by a crocodile who, instead of killing him, carries him back to the old wise man and his wife.

== Motifs ==
Some of its motifs reappear in later European fairy tales:

- The birth of a child is long delayed (cf. "Sleeping Beauty")
- Death is foretold at birth (cf. "Sleeping Beauty", "The Youth who was Doomed to be Hanged", "The Two Kings' Children")
- The attempt to prevent doom by measures of isolation from the natural environment (cf. "Sleeping Beauty")
- Three is the number of the dangers/tasks awaiting the protagonist
- Death of the mother, replaced by a stepmother who hates the protagonist(s) (cf. "Snowwhite", "Hansel and Gretel", "Cinderella")
- Leaving home to seek one's destiny/fortune
- Hiding one's true identity (cf. "Snow White", "Little Red Riding Hood"; Donkeyskin, "Iron John")
- Freeing a princess locked up in a high tower (cf. "Rapunzel")
- Competing with rivals and potential suitors to the princess in an engagement challenge, namely, jumping very high to reach the top of a tower (cf. "The Princess on the Glass Hill", "Iron John")
- Talking animals (cf. The Princess and the Frog; ATU tale types ATU 554, "The Grateful Animals")
- A person/animal setting (often unpalatable) conditions for helping the protagonist (cf. The Princess and the Frog, "Rumpelstiltskin")
- Cheating death, the ability to overcome doom

=== Fate goddesses ===
The Seven Hathors are goddesses that appear at the prince's birth to decree his fate. These characters may appear analogous to the Moirai or Parcae of Graeco-Roman mythology, or to the Norns of Norse mythology.

=== Inevitability of fate ===
Since the tale ends on an ambiguous note, some versions and translations of the story conclude with the death of the prince, as if to keep with the idea of inevitability of fate or the futility of trying to escape it. Under this lens, the tale is close to Aarne–Thompson–Uther Index tale type ATU 930, "The Prophecy that Poor boy shall marry rich girl". One example is Indian tale The King Who Would Be Stronger Than Fate: the king tries to dispose of his predestined future son-in-law, but his actions only serve to ensure that such fate will come to pass.

In folkloristics, the tale is classified as ATU 934A, "The Predestined Death".

=== Avoidance of fate ===
Once again, due to the unknown precise ending of the story, and also to the general direction of the traits (the dog's hesitance, the death of the snake, the crocodile's offer of help) one very likely conclusion of the tale is the general avoidance of the prince's gruesome fate and the more positive ending of having him avoid death by those creatures, eventually being free of his doomed fate.

== Versions ==
- Bristol Museums. "The Snake, the Crocodile, and the Dog" (PDF).
- Carew, Neil. "The Doomed Prince".
- Fleming, R. M. "The Doomed Prince". Fairytalez.com.
- "New Kingdom Part 2 (Episode 90-138). Mini Episode: The Doomed Prince". History of Egypt (Podcast).
- Lichtheim, Miriam. Ancient Egyptian Literature, Volume II: The New Kingdom, 200-203. University of California Press, 1976.
- Maspero, Gaston. 'Le Prince prédestiné'. Popular Stories of Ancient Egypt. Edited and with an introduction by Hasan El-Shamy. Oxford University Press/ABC-CLIO. 2002.
- Peet, T. Eric (1925). "The Legend of the Capture of Joppa and the Story of the Foredoomed Prince. Being a Translation of the Verso of Papyrus Harris 500". The Journal of Egyptian Archaeology. 11 (3/4): 225–29. doi:10.2307/3854145. JSTOR 3854145. Accessed 6 Sept. 2024.
- W. M. Flinders Petrie, ed. (1913) [1895]. Egyptian Tales Translated from the Papyri. Second Series: XVIIIth to XIXth Dynasty (second ed.). pp. 13–27.
- Ritner, Robert K.; Simpson, William Kelly; Tobin, Vincent A.; Wente, Edward F. (2003). "The Tale of the Doomed Prince". In William Kelly Simpson (ed.). The Literature of Ancient Egypt: An Anthology of Stories, Instructions, and Poetry. Yale University Press. pp. 75–79. ISBN 978-0-300-09920-1. JSTOR j.ctt5vm2m5.12.
- Tyldesley, Joyce; Heath, Julian (2005). "The Prince, The Dog, The Snake and the Crocodile". Stories from Ancient Egypt. Oxbow Books. pp. 65–77. doi:10.2307/j.ctvh1dnrw.13.

== Adaptations ==
=== Literature ===
Andrew Lang adapted the story as The Prince and the Three Fates for his work The Brown Fairy Book.

Manniche, Lise. The Prince Who Knew His Fate: An Ancient Egyptian Story. British Museum Publications, 1981.

Storynory. 'The Doomed Prince.' https://www.storynory.com/the-doomed-prince/

The Egyptian story was the inspiration for the 1992 Amelia Peabody mystery by Elizabeth Peters, The Snake, the Crocodile, and the Dog.

== Bibliography ==
- Anderson, Graham. ‘Rapunzel (AT Type 310)’ 121–122. Fairytale in the Ancient World, Routledge 2000. ISBN 0-415-23702-5
- Biase-Dyson, Camilla Di (2013). "Characterisation in The Doomed Prince". Foreigners and Egyptians in the Late Egyptian Stories. Brill. pp. 121–191. doi:10.1163/9789004251304_004. ISBN 978-90-04-25088-8.
- Cox, Alys. "Knowledge and Power in Ancient Egyptian Tales: Narratology and the story of The Doomed Prince." International Congress for Young Egyptologists. Vol. 25. 2012. https://www.dropbox.com/s/fu2s1srgwgju37v/Cult_and_Belief_in_Ancient_Egypt_Proceed.pdf?dl=0
- Fisher, Loren R. ‘The Enchanted Prince.’ 31–42. Tales from Ancient Egypt: The Birth of Stories. Wipf and Stock Publishers, 2010.
- Lichtheim, Marion. Ancient Egyptian Literature, vol.2. University of California Press,1976. 200–203.
- Mackenzie, Donald. Chapter 23, ‘Tale of the Doomed Prince’. Egyptian Myth and Legend: With Historical Narrative, Notes on Race Problems, Comparative Beliefs, etc. Gresham Publishing, 1907. https://earth-history.com/egypt/egyptian-myth-and-legend/1008-eml23
- Maspero, Gaston. Popular Stories of Ancient Egypt. Edited and with an introduction by Hasan El-Shamy. Oxford University Press/ABC-CLIO. 2002. p. xii
- Pehal, Martin. "Ancient Egyptian Mythological Narratives. Structural Interpretation of the Tale of Two Brothers, Tale of the Doomed Prince, the Astarte Papyrus, the Osirian Cycle and the Anat Myth." Thesis. Charles University, 2015.
- Petrie, W. M. Flinders. 'Close of the XVIIIth Dynasty: The Doomed Prince'. Zecharia Sitchin Index: A Comprehensive Index to the Earth Chronicles. https://zsitchinindex.wordpress.com/ancient-texts/egyptian-tales/the-doomed-prince/
- Posener, George. "On the Tale of the Doomed Prince." The Journal of Egyptian Archaeology 39 (1953): 107. doi:10.2307/3855317.
- Sherman, Josepha. ‘The Doomed Prince’ 123–124. Storytelling: An Encyclopedia of Mythology and Folklore. Sharpe Reference, 2008.
- Simpson, William Kelly ed., The Literature of Ancient Egypt: An Anthology of Stories, Instructions, and Poetry. Yale University Press, 2003, 75–79.
- Tales from the Enchanted Forest. ‘The Doomed Prince: Dog Days.‘ https://talesfromtheenchantedforest.com/2022/04/12/the-doomed-prince-and-the-three-fates/
- Thornton, Amara. ‘The Venerable Miss Harris.’ https://www.readingroomnotes.com/home/the-venerable-miss-harris
