= Wilhelm Wisser =

German author (1843–1935)

Wilhelm Wisser (27 August 1843 in Klenzau (Ostholstein district) – 13 October 1935 in Oldenburg) was a German teacher and dialectologist. He is remembered as a collector of Low German legends and fairy tales.

He took classical studies at the Universities of Kiel and Leipzig, obtaining his doctorate in 1869 with a thesis on the ancient poet Tibullus, "Quaestiones Tibullianae". Beginning in 1877, he taught classes at the Mariengymnasium in Jever. From 1887 to 1902, he was a senior instructor in Eutin, afterwards teaching classes at the gymnasium in Oldenburg (1902–1908).

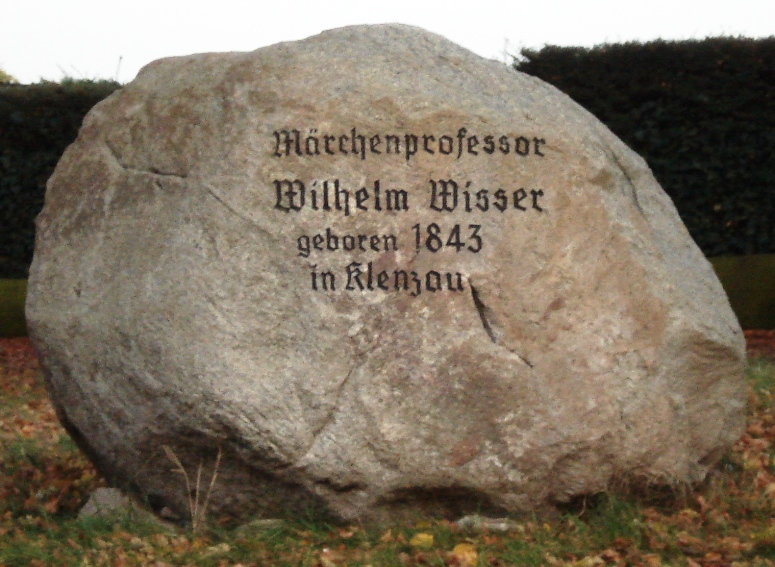
Gravestone of Wisser in Klenzau.

While working as a schoolteacher in Eutin and Oldenburg, he compiled Low German fairy tales by conducting interviews with numerous individuals. From 1898 to 1909, he interviewed in the region between the cities of Fehmarn and Lübeck, approximately 230 men and women, mostly elderly and rural persons, who still had recollections of the old tales. These stories were then edited and published by Wisser.

Today he is commemorated by a thoroughfare in Lübeck, (Wilhelm-Wisser-Weg) and by a junior high school in Eutin (Wilhelm-Wisser-Realschule).

== Selected works ==
- Wat Grotmoder vertellt : ostholsteinische Volksmärchen, 1904 – "Wat Grotmoder vertellt". Ostholstein folk tales; Reprint 1921, 3 volumes.
- Plattdeutsche Volksmärchen; Ausgabe für Erwachsene, 1913–1922 – Low German folk tales; Issue for adults...
- Auf der Märchensuche : die Entstehung meiner Märchensammlung, 1926 – In the search for fairy tales; the development of my collection of fairy tales.
