= Seasons of Glass and Iron =

2016 short story by Amal El-Mohtar

"Seasons of Glass and Iron" is a 2016 fantasy story by Canadian writer Amal El-Mohtar. It was first published in the anthology The Starlit Wood: New Fairy Tales.

== Synopsis ==
The story follows two girls who are trapped under magical curses that are reminiscent of old Norwegian fairy tales.: Tabitha is marching around the world until she wears out seven pairs of iron shoes in an effort to free her husband from an enchantment, while Amira sits atop a glass mountain awaiting a man to climb all the way up and claim her as his bride. When Tabitha accidentally climbs up Amira's mountain one day, they become friends, and their lives change.

== Origin ==
El-Mohtar was inspired to write the story when her 7-year-old niece asked to be told a fairy tale, but the only ones she could think of involved "women being rescued by men or tormented by other women".

== Reception ==
"Seasons of Glass and Iron" won the Nebula Award for Best Short Story of 2016, the 2017 Hugo Award for Best Short Story, and the 2017 Locus Award for Best Short Story. It was also shortlisted for the 2017 World Fantasy Award—Short Fiction, the 2017 Aurora Award for Best Short Fiction, and the 2017 Theodore Sturgeon Award.

Publishers Weekly called it "excellent", and observed that it "explores the power of women's friendships to rewrite—or at least expose—misogynist ideologies", while Tor.com noted that it "undermines the logic of [Tabitha and Amira's] self-imposed martyrdom" and "invites introspection".
