= Fire Boy (folktale) =

Japanese folktale

The Fire Boy is a Japanese folktale collected by scholar Seki Keigo. It tells of a boy expelled from home to another realm and, thanks to the efforts of a faithful horse, marries a lord's daughter.

== Summary ==
Long time ago, Mamichigane is born as the son to the lord of Omura. Some time later, his mother dies and his father remarries. One day, he has to go to Edo on a journey of three months and asks his wife to look after his son and to comb his hair. After her husband leaves, the stepmother forces the boy to do chores for them (gather wood and rake the garden). With time, the boy's appearance becomes dirty and unkempt.

Three months pass, and Mamichigane's father's ship arrives at the port. The boy goes to see his father, while his stepmother stays at home. However, she takes a blade and makes a deep cut across her cheek. The boy and his father return home and see the stepmother lying on the bed with the cut on her face. She lies to her husband that the boy threatened her and hurt her with a razor.

Believing her lies, the father expels his son from home, but gives him some provisions for the road: a beautiful kimono and his best horse. Travelling to another town, he finds works as a gardener and a cook for a local lord, and is given the name "fire boy".

One day, his master, the lord, tells fire boy of a dancing contest that he will attend and invites his servant, but the boy excuses himself. Fire Boy leaves work, dresses in his father's finest kimono and rides his horse to the festival. Fire Boy, under this disguise, impresses the guests - who mistake him for a heavenly deity - and captures the heart of his master's daughter, who recognizes the rider as the fire boy for a mark on his ear. This repeats the next day, but with a difference: his master's daughter returns home because she forgot a sandal; seeing the girl there, the Fire boy-as-rider takes her on the horse to the festival. Once there, the guests mistake them for a divine couple.

The lord's daughter falls ill with longing for the mysterious rider, and a shrine priestess advises her father to line up all of his male staff. After his male servants are queued up, the lord's daughter is to give a cup to her suitor. She sees that her beloved, the fire boy, is not there, so her father summons him and tells some servants to clean him up and dress him in better clothes. The fire boy enters the bath and are given his master's old clothes to wear. He uses the garments to dry himself up and wears the kimono his father gave him to present himself before his master's daughter.

At the end of the tale, Mamichigane decides to visit his father's home. On the way, despite his wife's warnings, he eats poisoned mulberries and dies. His horse brings his master Mamichigane's body to his home, accompanied by the boy's wife. When the animal whinnies to announce their presence, the boy's stepmother answers the door and is killed by the horse. The lord comes outside to check on the commotion, and sees the horse with his son's body. He takes the body inside and his daughter-in-law sprinkles some water of life to revive her husband. Mamichigane awakes, greets his father, and decides to move out and live with his wife.

== Analysis ==
=== Tale type ===
In his 1987 study of folktales, folklorist D. L. Ashliman classified the Japanese tale as type AaTh 314, "The Golden-Haired Boy and his Magic Horse".

In Hiroko Ikeda's index of Japanese folktales, this tale is classified as type 314, "Cinder Boy (Haibo, Neko no Tsura)": a youth leaves home (either expelled by his stepmother or flees from a cannibal sister) and works under a master as his bath heater; he goes to a play and his master's daughter sees him in fine clothes; she finds out the young man at the play is the bath heater, and marries him. Scholar Kunio Yanagita noted that these tales were the male counterpart of the heroine of the set of tales titled The girl who tended fires.

The character is also known as Hai-bō or Haibōtarō (Japanese alphabet: 灰坊太郎). His name may be alternatively translated as "Cinder-Boy", "Flute Playing Cinder Man", "Ash Boy". Due to his name and plot circumstances, the character has been related by scholarship to the European fairy tale of Cinderella.

In regards to this tale, Seki Keigo surmised that the tale was a recent importation into his native Japan, since only seven variants were reported. Keigo also noted the presence of the "Male Cinderella" motif.

== Variants ==
=== Japan ===
Seki Keigo located similar stories in the following regions: Aomori, Ishikawa, Iwate, Ogasawara, Kagoshima, Nagano, Nagasaki, Niigata, Okayama, Shimane, Tokushima, and Yamanashi. Kunio Yaganita also reported variants in mostly the same places, but listed tales in Fukuoka.

Yanagita provided the summary of a tale from Ikinoshima, Nagasaki: a youth named Sanpachi works as a bath heater to a warrior, but is actually a samurai who has fallen on hard times. One day, when the warrior's family leaves to watch a Noh drama play, Sanpachi enters the bath, washes himself, dresses in the most splendid samurai armor and also goes to the Noh theatre. He returns before his master's family, and they comment on the mysterious samurai. Some time later, the warrior's daughter falls ill; Sanpachi stays by her side and restores her health, and both marry.

=== Korea ===
Korean scholarship reports similar tales in Korea, with the title 재복데기 (Jaebokdegi; English: "Cinder Sweeper"). The name refers to the chores at his master's house: to sweep the floor and tend to the kitchen hearth, although the protagonist may also be known by different names depending on his work: maridungi ('floor polisher'), agungijigi ('hearth fire keeper'). The youth escapes a cruel treatment by his stepmother or other cruel fate; is given a magical vest and a flute that allows him to fly; he flies to a banquet and impresses his master's family and guests, who also mistake him for a "Taoist high official" (seongwan); at the end of the tale marries his master's daughter.

In a Korean tale translated into German language as Feueraufpasser ("The Flametender"), a poor widow lives with her son. She decides it is time her son found a job and married off. So the boy tells his mother to sew him a fine silken garment, for he plans to find a job and a wife somewhere in the world. His mother gives him the silken garment, and bids him goodbye. He hides the garment under some shabby clothes and finds a guesthouse. He begs for work, even agreeing to work as the servant who tends and stokes the fire in the hearth. One day, he asks to borrow a comb from one of his master's three daughters, but only the youngest is kind enough to lend it.

In another tale, Die Jadeflöte ("The Jade Flute"), a childless minister has a dream: an ethereal emissary points him to location behind the mountains. He finds a flower and gives it to his wife. She bears a son and names him Migyong. He raises the boy. One day, a monk visits the couple and senses a strange destiny that awaits the boy. The minister questions the monk, who reveals the boy will die by a tiger and the only way to avoid this fate is to let him be raised by the monk. The minister agrees to let his son go with him, and gives his a parting gift: a fine robe embroidered with gold and silver. The monk takes the boy to his hut and names him Tugodugogóji. After some time, the monk dismisses the boy, but teaches him a poem and gives him a flute. The boy arrives at a town and finds work as a floor sweeper and horse groomer to a local master. One day, his master's brother is having a festival in honor of his birthday and invites his brother and nieces. Tugodugogóji asks his master's three daughters to bring some sweets on the way back; the two elders insult him, but the third just smiles at him. While his master's family is away at the festival, Tugodugogóji washes himself, wears his father's present and blows on the jade flute. A divine horse ("Drachenross") appears to take him to the festival. Once there, the guests mistake him for some deity, except the master's third daughter, who feels a strange familiarity about the newcomer.

== See also ==
- Askeladden
- The Black Colt
- The Magician's Horse
- Iron Hans
- The Princess on the Glass Hill
- The Boy with the Moon on his Forehead
