= Old Rinkrank =

German fairy tale

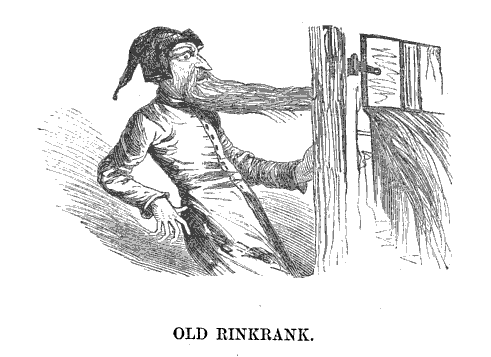

Folk tale
- Name: Old Rinkrank
- Origin Date: 6th edition 1850
- Published in: Children's and Household Tales

"Old Rinkrank" (similar to Aarne–Thompson type 311) is a German fairy tale collected by the Grimm Brothers and published in Children's and Household Tales, 6th ed. (German: Kinder- und Hausmärchen). A princess falls into the glass mountain and is entrapped by Old Rinkrank. She becomes his slave until she frees herself.

== Synopsis ==
A king has a glass mountain built, declaring that whoever scales its slope could marry his daughter. The princess decides to aid one of the suitors. As the princess and her suitor climb, she slips; the glass mountain opens up and swallows her. She is found by Old Rinkrank in the cave she falls into. He offers her death or servitude.

As his servant, she washes his dishes, makes his bed, and grows old. He takes to calling her Mother Mansrot. Every day Old Rinkrank takes his ladder out of his pocket, using it to climb to the top of mountain, and pulls the ladder up behind him. Every evening he returns with gold and silver to add to his hoard.

One day Mother Mansrot washes his dishes, makes his bed, then shuts all the doors and windows, except one small window. She refuses to open up when Rinkrank returns. He looks through the small window to see what she is up to, and she slams the window sash on his beard. Trapped, he must surrender the ladder.

After climbing to the top of the mountain, she releases him by pulling on a long rope. Returning to her father and betrothed, she tells them what has happened to her. The king condemns Old Rinkrank to death, taking his gold and silver. The princess finally marries, and they live in splendor and joy.

== History and background ==
This story did not appear in the Grimms’ collection until the sixth edition of the seven they produced. According to their notes, they found it in Frisian Archiv von Ehrentraut, written in Frisian dialect, which may have appealed to the Grimms because of its rustic nature, but which is difficult to read in German and more difficult to translate into English. One verse of rhyme, in particular, has been construed variously as “Here stand I, poor Rinkrank, On my seventeen long shanks, On my weary, worn-out foot," and also as "Here I stand, poor Rinkrank, Seventeen feet long I stand on planks, On my tired-out feet."

There are numerous glass mountain stories. They harken back to Brynhildr's deliverance from the Hall of Flame, protected by a wall of shields atop Mount Hindarfjall, which only the horse Grani could reach. Usually, the variants involve a princess sitting on top of the glass mountain, often holding a golden apple, to which knights on horseback must ascend.
